= 1690s =

The 1690s decade ran from January 1, 1690, to December 31, 1699.

== Events ==
=== January–March ===
- January 2 – The Ottoman Empire defeats Serbian rebels and Austrian troops in battle at Kaçanik Gorge, prompting more than 30,000 Serb refugees to flee northward from Kosovo, Macedonia and Sandžak to the Austrian Empire.
- January 6 – At the age of 11 years old, Prince Joseph, son of Leopold I, Holy Roman Emperor, is named as "King of the Romans", the next in line to become the Emperor.
- January 7 – The first recorded full peal is rung, at St Sepulchre-without-Newgate in the City of London, marking a new era in change ringing.
- January 13 – Captain Thomas Pound, after being captured with his crew the previous month, is tried in Boston and found guilty of piracy although he is later reprieved.
- January 27
  - The crew of the ship HMS Welfare, commanded by John Strong, become the first European people to land at the Falkland Islands.
  - William Coward is hanged for acts of piracy, following his capture after seizing the ketch Elenor anchored in Boston Harbor the previous year.
  - The Convention Parliament is dissolved in England.
- February 6 – King William III of England calls for new elections for the 512-member House of Commons
- February 8 – The Schenectady massacre takes place in the village of Schenectady in the colony of New York, when 200 Frenchmen, Mohawk and Algonquin warriors kill or capture most of the inhabitants in retaliation for the Lachine massacre.
- February 21 – The opera Orphée by Louis Lully receives its first performance at the Académie Royale de Musique (the Paris Opera).
- March 10 – An annular solar eclipse is visible across the south of the Pacific Ocean.
- March 20 – The 2nd Parliament of William III and Mary II is assembled in London, split almost equally with 243 Whigs, 241 Tories, and 28 independent members.

=== April–June ===
- April 6 – Leopold I, Holy Roman Emperor issues a document inviting Serbians to resettle in Hungary, at this time a part of the Empire.
- April 16 – An estimated 8.0 magnitude earthquake strikes in the Caribbean Sea less than 10 miles (16 km) from Barbuda and also affects St. Kitts and Nevis, as well as Antigua.
- April 25 – The Parliament of Scotland passes an Act to abolish episcopy in the presbyterian Church of Scotland. The Anglican Episcopal Church in Scotland continues as a separate denomination, retaining bishops.
- April 27 – Sultan Toloko ibn-Sibori becomes the new Sultan of Ternate, located on the Maluku Islands in the Dutch East Indies after the death of his father, Sultan Sibori Amsterdam.
- May 16 – The Battle of Port Royal takes place in Nova Scotia after an invasion by a militia of 446 soldiers and 226 sailors from the Massachusetts Bay Colony on seven warships. With only 90 French colonial soldiers to defend Port-Royal, Acadian Governor Louis-Alexandre des Friches de Menneval surrenders before the end of the day.
- May 20 – England passes the Act of Grace, forgiving followers of the deposed James II.
- June 8 – Siddi general Yadi Sakat razes the Mazagon Fort in Mumbai.
- June 14 – King William III of England (William of Orange) lands in Ireland to confront James II.
- June – An earthquake in Brazil of estimated magnitude 7, with epicenter on the left bank of the Amazon River about 45 km downstream from Manaus, spreads seismic waves through the forest and is felt up to 1000 km away.

=== July–September ===
- July 10 (June 30 O.S.) – Battle of Beachy Head: the Anglo-Dutch navy is defeated by the French, giving rise to fears of a Jacobite invasion of England.
- July 11 (July 1 O.S.) – Battle of the Boyne in Ireland: King William III of England (William of Orange) defeats the deposed James II, who returns to exile in France. The rebellion in Ireland continues for a further year until the Orange army gains full control.
- July 26 – A French landing party raids and burns Teignmouth in Devon, England. However, with the loss of James II's position in Ireland, any plans for a real invasion are soon shelved, and Teignmouth is the last French attack on England.
- August 24 – In India, the fort and trading settlement of Sutanuti is founded on the Hooghly River by the English East India Company, following the signing of an Anglo-Mughal treaty.
- September 25 – The only issue of Publick Occurrences is published in Boston, Massachusetts, before being suppressed by the colonial authorities.

=== October–December ===
- October 6
  - Massachusetts Puritans, led by Sir William Phips, besiege the city of Quebec; the siege ends in failure after six days.
  - An earthquake with strength 5.2 occurs in Caernarfon, Wales, causing tremors that can be felt as far away as London and Dublin.
- October 8 – Great Turkish War: The Ottomans recapture Belgrade.
- October 16 – Lawrence Justinian (1381–1456) and John of Sahagún (c. 1430–79) are canonized by Pope Alexander VIII.
- October 21 – The play Amphitryon by John Dryden, based on Molière's 1668 play of the same name, receives its first performance at the Theatre Royal, Drury Lane, London.
- November 7 – The opera Énée et Lavinie (Aeneas and Lavinia) by the French composer Pascal Collasse receives its first performance at the Académie Royale de Musique (the Paris Opera).
- November 9 – Near South Mimms, England, several highwaymen stop a convoy carrying taxes from the Midlands to London and take £15,000.
- November 17 – Barclays, which will continue to be active into the 21st century as a multinational bank and lending institution, is founded in London by John Freame and Thomas Gould as Freame & Gould. The bank changes its name in 1736 when James Barclay becomes a partner.
- December 4 – A destructive earthquake in the Eastern Alps causes 24 casualties and results in damage in the Villach, Carinthia area.
- December 10 –Playwright Henry Nevil Payne is tortured for his role in the Montgomery Plot to restore James II to the throne — the last time a political prisoner is legally subjected to torture in Britain.
- December 13 – The planet Uranus is first sighted and recorded, by England's first Astronomer Royal, John Flamsteed, who mistakenly catalogs it as a star 34 Tauri.
- December 20 (December 10, 1690 O.S.) — The General Court of the Province of Massachusetts Bay creates the first authorized paper money issued by any government in the Western World as a substitute for coins. The first money is printed on February 13, 1691 (N.S.) and is dated "Feb. 3, 1690" based on the British old style calendar in use at the time.
- December 29 – An earthquake hits Ancona, in the Papal States of Italy and causes 10 deaths.

=== Date unknown ===
- Serbian Patriarch Arsenije III Crnojević leads the first of the two Great Serbian Migrations into the Habsburg Empire, following Ottoman atrocities in Kosovo.
- The Hearth Tax is abolished in Scotland, one year after its abolition in England and Wales.
- French physicist Denis Papin, while in Leipzig and having observed the mechanical power of atmospheric pressure on his 'digester', builds a working model of a reciprocating steam engine for pumping water, the first of its kind, though not efficient.
- Dutch polymath Christiaan Huygens publishes his book Treatise on Light. The book is considered a pioneering work of theoretical and mathematical physics.
- Giovanni Domenico Cassini observes differential rotation within Jupiter's atmosphere.
- The construction of Fort Longueuil, a stone fort in Longueuil, in Quebec, Canada, is completed. It is one of the only buildings in Canada that could ever be considered a castle (fortified residence for a noble), and out of those buildings it most resembles the castles of Europe.
- The Barrage Vauban, a defensive work in the city of Strasbourg (in modern-day France), is completed.
- The French dictionary and encyclopaedia Dictionnaire universel, contenant generalement tous les mots françois, compiled by Antoine Furetière, is published posthumously.
- Possible year of the disappearance of the western part of the island of Buise, in St. Peter's Flood.

=== January–March ===
- January 6 – King William III of England, who rules Scotland and Ireland as well as being the Stadtholder of the Dutch Republic, departs from Margate to tend to the affairs of the Netherlands.
- January 14 – A fleet of ships carrying 827 Spanish Navy sailors and marines arrives at Manzanillo Bay on the island of Hispaniola in what is now the Dominican Republic and joins 700 Spanish cavalry, then proceeds westward to invade the French side of the island in what is now Haiti.
- January 15 – King Louis XIV of France issues an order specifically prohibiting play of games of chance, specifically naming basset and similar games, on penalty of 1,000 livres for the first offence.
- January 23 – Spanish colonial administrator Domingo Terán de los Ríos, most recently the governor of Sonora y Sinaloa on the east side of the Gulf of California, is assigned by the Viceroy of New Spain to administer a new province that governs lands on both sides of the Río Bravo del Norte, "Coahuila y Tejas", and effectively becomes the first Governor of Texas.
- February 13 – The Massachusetts Bay Colony issues the first paper money in North America, in lieu of coins, two months after a December 20 law authorizing the printing. The oldest known specimen, for 20 Massachusetts shillings bears the date "Feb. 3, 1690" based on the British old style calendar in use at the time.
- February 28 – An annular solar eclipse is visible across the Philippines, North Borneo and eastern Sumatra.
- March 5 – Nine Years' War: French troops under Marshal Louis-Francois de Boufflers besiege the Spanish-held town of Mons.
- March 14 – The Public Security Police Force of Macau is founded.
- March 17 – The Athenian Mercury begins twice-weekly publication by The Athenian Society in London.
- March 20 – Leisler's Rebellion: A new governor arrives in New York – Jacob Leisler surrenders, after a standoff of several hours.
- March 29 – The Siege of Mons ends in the city's surrender.

=== April–June ===
- April 9 – A fire at the Palace of Whitehall in London destroys its Stone Gallery.
- May 6
  - The Spanish Inquisition condemns and forcibly baptizes 219 Xuetas in Palma, Majorca. When 37 try to escape the island, they are burned alive at the stake.
  - The Province of New York establishes the New York Supreme Court as the Supreme Court of Judicature. It is the oldest Supreme Court with general original jurisdiction.
- May 16 – Jacob Leisler is hanged for treason.
- June – The first performance takes place of the semi-opera King Arthur with a libretto by John Dryden and music by Henry Purcell.
- June 23 – Ahmed II (1691–1695) succeeds Suleiman II (1687–1691), as Ottoman Emperor.

=== July–September ===
- July 12
  - Pope Innocent XII becomes the 242nd pope, succeeding Pope Alexander VIII.
  - Williamite War in Ireland – Battle of Aughrim: Protestant Williamite forces, led by Godert de Ginkell, decisively defeat Jacobites under the Marquis de St Ruth (who is killed).
- August 11 – Battle of La Prairie in Canada: An English and Iroquois force come north from Albany, New York to attack Montreal, but are repulsed with significant casualties by the French and their First Nations allies.
- August 19 – The Battle of Slankamen takes place between the Ottoman Empire and the Holy Roman Empire and allies at Syrmia (now the Serbian province of Vojvodina), and 25,000 Ottomans are killed, including Köprülüzade Fazıl Mustafa Pasha, the Grand Vizier.
- August 23 – A total solar eclipse is visible across South America, Central America and Mexico.
- August 27 – In Scotland, King William offers the Highland clans a pardon for their part in the Jacobite rising of 1689 if they agree to pledge allegiance to him before New Year's Day.
- September 3 – HMS Coronation and HMS Harwich are lost in a storm while making for shelter in Plymouth Sound with 900 killed.
- September 18 – War of the Grand Alliance: English and Dutch forces are defeated by the French in the Battle of Leuze.

=== October–December ===
- October 3 – The Treaty of Limerick, ending the Williamite War in Ireland and guaranteeing civil rights to Roman Catholics, is signed. The Flight of the Wild Geese follows.
- October 17 (October 7 O.S.) – In New England, the two separate colonies of Massachusetts Bay Colony and Plymouth Colony are united into a single entity by an act of the King and Queen of England.
- November 26 – In Limerick, "A Form of Prayer and Thanksgiving to the Almighty God for the Preservation of Their Majesties, the Success of Their Forces in the reducing of Ireland, and for His Majesties Safe Return" is celebrated in all Anglican churches in Britain and Ireland by order of Archbishop Tillotson.
- December 6 – During the Morean War, Captain Luca Dalla Rocca of Naples betrays Venice by surrendering the fortress of Gramvousa, on the island of Crete to the Ottoman Turks, in return for a large amount of money and sanctuary in Istanbul.
- December 22 – Patrick Sarsfield and 19,000 troops of the Irish Army who had been supporters of the Jacobite Rebellion leave the country and relocate to France.

=== Date unknown ===
- HMNB Devonport, currently one of three operating bases in the United Kingdom for the Royal Navy and the largest naval base in Western Europe, opens.
- Michel Rolle invents Rolle's theorem, which states that any real-valued differentiable function that attains equal values at two distinct points must have at least one stationary point somewhere between them.
- The Khalkha submit to the Manchu invaders, bringing most of modern-day Mongolia under the rule of the Qing Dynasty.
- Nimavar school in Isfahan, Iran is built and opens in this era of Suleiman I.
- The textile factory Barnängens manufaktur is founded in Stockholm, Sweden.
- The Society for the Reformation of Manners is founded in the London Borough of Tower Hamlets with the aim of suppressing profanity, immorality, and other lewd activities in general, and of brothels and prostitution in particular.

=== January–March ===
- January 24 –King William's War – Candlemas Massacre: At least 75 residents of what is now York, Maine are killed by French soldiers, led by missionary Louis-Pierre Thury, along with a larger force of Abenaki and Penobscot Indians, under the command of Penobscot Chief Madockawando.
- January 30 – English Army General John Churchill, 1st Duke of Marlborough, a close adviser to King William III of England, is fired from all of his jobs by the English Secretary of State, the Earl of Nottingham, on orders of Queen Mary II.
- February 13 – Massacre of Glencoe: The forces of Robert Campbell slaughter around 30 members of the Clan MacDonald of Glencoe in Scotland (from whom they have previously accepted hospitality), for delaying to sign an oath of allegiance to King William III of England.
- February 17 – An annular solar eclipse is visible across Russia, western Mongolia, Xinjiang, Iran, Afghanistan and Iran.
- March 1 – The Salem witch trials begin in Salem Village, Massachusetts Bay Colony, with the charging of 3 women with witchcraft. Tituba, a slave owned by Samuel Parris, is the first to be arrested, and she implicates Sarah Good and Sarah Osborne, who are arrested later in the day.
- March 22 – The Kangxi Emperor of the Qing dynasty issues the Edict of Toleration, recognizing all the members of the Roman Catholic Church, not just the Jesuits, and legalizing missions and their conversion of Chinese people to the Christian Faith.

=== April–June ===
- April 18 – Giles Corey, Mary Warren, Abigail Hobbs and Bridget Bishop, all residents of Salem, Massachusetts, are arrested and charged with the practice of witchcraft.
- May 2 – The first performance of the semi-opera The Fairy-Queen by Henry Purcell, based on William Shakespeare's comedy A Midsummer Night's Dream, takes place at the Queen's Theatre, Dorset Garden in London.
- May 29 (May 19 O.S.) – Nine Years' War: Battle of Barfleur – The Anglo-Dutch fleet breaks the French line off the Cotentin Peninsula, foiling the French plan to invade England.
- June 7 – Jamaica earthquake: An earthquake and related tsunami destroy Port Royal, capital of Jamaica, and submerge a major part of it; an estimated 2,000 are immediately killed, 2,300 injured, and a probable additional 2,000 die from the diseases which ravage the island in the following months.
- June 8 – During a famine in Mexico City, an angry mob torches the Viceroy's palace and ignites the archives; most of the documents and some paintings are saved by royal geographer Carlos de Sigüenza y Góngora.
- June 10 – The Salem witch trials' first victim, Bridget Bishop, is hanged for witchcraft.
- June 13–14 (June 3–4 O.S.) – Nine Years' War: Battle of La Hogue – The action begun at Barfleur ends with further destruction of the French fleet.
- June 22 – Pope Innocent XII issues the papal bull Romanum decet Pontificem, intended to prohibit the office of cardinal-nephew and restrict related sinecures within the Roman Catholic church.

=== July–September ===
- July 1 – The siege of the Belgian city of Namur in the Spanish Netherlands ends as Dutch General Menno van Coehoorn capitulates to King Louis XIV of France after five weeks. The siege, a battle in the ongoing Nine Years War, had begun on May 24.
- July 5 – Wine shop owner Antoine Savetier and his wife are murdered by thieves in the French city of Lyon, and a peasant named Jacques Aymar-Vernay is called in as a detective to solve the case. Aymar finds one of the perpetrators, Joseph Arnoul, who confesses to the crime and implicates two accomplices who manage to escape. Arnoul is executed by being "broken on the wheel" on August 30.
- August 12
  - The city of Ponce is founded in Puerto Rico.
  - A total solar eclipse is visible in the South Atlantic Ocean.
- September 8 – An earthquake in Brabant of scale 5.8 is felt across the Low Countries, Germany and England.
- September 14 – Diego de Vargas leads Spanish colonists in retaking the city of Santa Fe, after a 12-year exile, following the Pueblo Revolt of 1680.
- September 19 – Giles Corey is pressed to death in an attempt to coerce a confession from him of witchcraft during the Salem witch trials.
- September 22 – The last of those convicted of witchcraft in the Salem witch trials are hanged. By the end of September, 14 women and 5 men have been executed by hanging. The remainder of those convicted are all eventually released.
- September 27 – The trial for sorcery of Anne Palles of Denmark begins, and she gives a long confession of giving her body and soul to Satan. The court finds her guilty on November 2 and sentences her to death.

=== October–December ===
- October 21 – In Barbados, a slave revolt is crushed.
- October 30 – The King of Spain donates the lands that become the municipalities of San Francisco and Mapulaca in Honduras.
- November 5 – Mohamed bin Hajj Ali Thukkala becomes the new Sultan of the Maldives as Muhammad Ali IV.
- November 8 – William Mountfort's play Henry The Second, King Of England; With The Death Of Rosamond is given its first performance, premiering at the Drury Lane Theatre.
- December 5 – John Goldsborough arrives in Madras as the new administrator of the British East India Company.
- December 14 – Maratha Empire General Santaji Ghorpade defeats Mughal Emperor Aurangzeb's General Alimardan Khan, captures him and brings him back to fort Jinjee near Madras.
- December 23 – Nahum Tate is named as the new Poet Laureate of the United Kingdom and serves for 22 years until his death.
- December 24 – The French ship Soleil Royal, a three-decker First Rank ship with 104 guns, is launched at Brest Dockyard.

=== January–March ===
- January 11 – The Mount Etna volcano erupts in Italy, causing a devastating earthquake that kills 60,000 people in Sicily and Malta.
- January 22 – A total lunar eclipse is visible across North and South America.
- February 8 – The College of William & Mary in Williamsburg, Virginia is granted a Royal charter.
- February 27 – The publication of the first women's magazine, titled The Ladies' Mercury, takes place in London. It is published by the Athenian Society.
- March 27 – Bozoklu Mustafa Pasha becomes the new Grand Vizier of the Ottoman Empire, after Sultan Ahmed II appoints him as the successor of Çalık Ali Pasha.

=== April–June ===
- April 4 – Anne Palles becomes the last accused witch to be executed for witchcraft in Denmark, after having been convicted of using powers of sorcery. King Christian V accepts her plea not to be burned alive, and she is beheaded before her body is set afire.
- April 5 – The Order of Saint Louis, the first medal to be awarded in France to military personnel who are not members of nobility, is created by order of King Louis XIV, and named after his ancestor, King Louis IX.
- April 28 – The 90-gun English Royal Navy warship HMS Windsor Castle is wrecked beyond repair on the Goodwin Sands.
- April – Tituba, a slave who had been convicted at the Salem witch trials of practicing witchcraft after making a confession, is released from jail in Boston after 13 months when an unknown purchaser pays her jail fees.
- May 18 – Forces of Louis XIV of France attack Heidelberg, capital of the Electorate of the Palatinate.
- May 22 – Heidelberg is taken by the invading French forces; on May 23 Heidelberg Castle is surrendered, after which the French blow up its towers using mines.
- June 5 – The first performance of the opera Didon by French composer Henri Desmarets takes place at the Théâtre du Palais-Royal in Paris.
- June 27 – Nine Years' War – Battle of Lagos off Portugal: The French fleet defeats the joint Dutch and English fleet.

=== July–September ===
- July 17 – A total lunar eclipse is visible in New Zealand and across the Pacific Ocean.
- July 29 – Nine Years' War – Battle of Landen: William III of England is defeated by the French (with Irish Jacobite mercenaries).
- August 21 – The Indian Ocean port of Pondicherry, capital of French India is captured by a 17-ship fleet from the Netherlands and 1,600 men under the command of Laurens Pit the Younger.
- September 9 – Francesco Invrea, King of Corsica, begins a two-year term as the Doge of the Republic of Genoa in Italy, succeeding Giovanni Battista Cattaneo Della Volta.
- September 10 – France begins the siege of the Spanish Netherlands (now Belgium) fort of Charleroi.
- September 14 – King Louis XIV of France sends a letter to Pope Innocent XII announcing the rescission of the Declaration of the Clergy of France issued in 1682.
- September 23 – Manuel Afonso Nzinga a Nlenke, ruling as King Manuel I of the Kingdom of Kongo (in present-day northern Angola) is executed on orders of the new king, Álvaro X.

=== October–December ===
- October – William Congreve's comedy The Double-Dealer is first performed in London.
- October 4 – Battle of Marsaglia near Turin in the Duchy of Savoy: A French force under the command of General Nicolas Catinat defeats the Savoyard forces, leaving 10,000 dead or wounded, while sustaining only 1,000 casualties.
- October 11 – Charleroi falls to French forces.
- October 29 – The Great Storm changes the course of rivers and alters the coastline from Virginia to Long Island in America.
- November 7 – King Charles II of Spain issues a royal edict providing sanctuary in Spanish Florida for escaped slaves from the English colony of South Carolina.
- November 14 – General Santaji Ghorpade of the Maratha Empire in India is defeated by General Himmat Khan of the Mughal Empire near Vikramhalli, and retreats. A week later, after regrouping his troops, Santaji defeats Himmat at their next encounter.
- November 21 – The 46-gun Royal Navy frigate HMS Mordaunt founders off of the coast of Cuba.
- November 29 – A fleet of 30 English and Dutch ships captures the French port of Saint-Malo
- December 16 – Diego de Vargas, Spanish colonial governor of Santa Fe de Nuevo México (now the area around the capital of the U.S. state of New Mexico), returns to the walled city of Santa Fe and requests the Pueblo people to accept the authority of the colonial government. Negotiations fail and a siege begins on December 29. The Pueblo defenders surrender the next day and the 70 rebels are executed soon after. The 400 civilian women and children are made slaves and distributed to the Spanish colonists.
- December 27 – The new 80-gun English Navy warship HMS Sussex departs Portsmouth on its maiden voyage, escorting a fleet of 48 warships and 166 merchant ships to the Mediterranean Sea. The fleet runs into a storm on February 27, 1694, and on March 1, Sussex and 12 other warships sink, along with a cargo of gold.

=== Date unknown ===
- China concentrates all its foreign trade on Canton; European ships are forbidden to land anywhere else.
- A religious schism takes place in Switzerland, within a group of Swiss and Alsatian Anabaptists led by Jakob Ammann. Those who follow Ammann become the Mennonite Amish sect.
- The Knights of the Apocalypse are formed in Italy.
- The Academia Operosorum Labacensium is established in Ljubljana, Slovenia.
- Financier Richard Hoare relocates Hoare's Bank (founded 1672) from Cheapside to Fleet Street in London.
- Italian barber Giovanni Paolo Feminis creates a perfume water called Aqua Admirabilis, earliest known form of eau de Cologne.
- John Locke publishes his influential book Some Thoughts Concerning Education.
- William Penn publishes his proposal for European federation, Essay on the Present and Future Peace of Europe.
- English astronomer Edmond Halley studies records of births and deaths in Breslau (Poland), producing a life table consolidating year of birth and age at death. He uses this to work out the price of life annuities.
- Dimitrie Cantemir presents his Kitâbu 'İlmi'l-Mûsiki alâ Vechi'l-Hurûfât (The Book of the Science of Music through Letters) to Sultan Ahmed II, which deals with melodic and rhythmic structure and practice of Ottoman music, and contains the scores for around 350 works composed during and before his own time, in an alphabetical notation system he invented.

=== January–March ===
- January 16 – Francesco Morosini, the Doge of Venice since 1688, dies after ruling the Republic for more than five years and a few months after an unsuccessful attempt to capture the island of Negropont from the Ottoman Empire during the Morean War.
- January 18 – Sir James Montgomery of Scotland, who had been arrested on January 11 for conspiracy to restore King James to the throne, escapes and flees to France.
- January 21 (January 11 O.S.) – The Kiev Academy, predecessor of the national university of Ukraine, receives official recognition by Tsar Ivan V of Russia.
- January 28 – Pirro e Demetrio, an opera by Alessandro Scarlatti, is given its first performance, debuting at the Teatro San Bartolomeo in Naples. The opera is adapted in 1708 in London as Pyrrhus and Demetrius and becomes the second most popular opera in 18th century London.
- January 29 – French missionary Jean-Baptiste Labat arrives in the New World, landing at the Caribbean island of Martinique.
- February 5 – The ship Ridderschap van Holland is lost at sea, having departed the Cape of Good Hope with a crew of 300, with a destination of Batavia (modern-day Jakarta in Indonesia), normally a voyage of two months. It never arrives and is never seen again.
- February 6 – The colony of Quilombo dos Palmares, created by rebel African slaves in Brazil, is destroyed by the bandeirantes, colonial troops under the command of Domingos Jorge Velho. After a successful attack on its capital, Cerca do Macaco, the last King of Dos Palmares, Zumbi, flees after a reign of more than 13 years, but is later captured and executed.
- February 26 – Silvestro Valier is elected as the new Doge of Venice to replace the late Francesco Morosini
- March 1 – British flagship HMS Sussex (1693) (carrying gold coin) and twelve other ships are wrecked in a storm in the Mediterranean off Gibraltar with the loss of approximately 1,200 lives.
- March 8 – The Casa da Moeda do Brasil is formed by Peter II of Portugal.

=== April–June ===
- April 2 – Sheikh Yusuf, exiled by the administrators of the Dutch East Indies (modern-day Indonesia), arrives at the Dutch Cape Colony on the ship De Voetboog, at what later becomes Cape Town, South Africa, along with two wives, two concubines and twelve children. Resettled by the colonial government at a farm in Zandvliet, the Sheikh introduces Islam to South Africa.
- April 7 – The British Royal Navy's 40-gun warship HMS Ruby captures the French privateer Entreprenant in battle. The confiscated ship is renamed HMS Ruby Prize.
- April 12 – The French ship Diligente, commanded by René Duguay-Trouin, covers the escape of a convoy of ships that he is escorting, but then is surrounded and attacked by six Royal Navy ships led by David Mitchell. Most of the Diligente crew is lost in the battle, and Duguay-Trouin is captured.
- April 13 – The largest volcanic eruption of Mount Vesuvius since 1631 takes place, with lava flows towards both San Giorgio a Cremano and Torre del Greco, after explosions in the crater that began April 5. Around April 20, ash falls are experienced as far away as Calabria.
- April 27 – Frederick Augustus of Wettin, later known as "Augustus the Strong" and the future King of Poland, becomes the new Elector of Saxony upon the death of his 25-year-old older brother, John George IV
- May 27 – Taking advantage of a fog, the French Army, with 24,000 troops, fights the Battle of Torroella against an equally large Spanish Army force on the banks of the Ter in Spain, near the city of Girona during the Nine Years' War. The Spaniards suffer 3,000 casualties, while the French sustain 500.
- June 22 – An annular solar eclipse is visible across North America and the Atlantic Ocean.
- June 24 – The Tunisian–Algerian War begins as Algerian troops cross into Tunisia.
- June 29 – The Battle of Texel is fought near the Dutch island of Texel, one of the West Frisian Islands. The French Navy force of 8 ships, commanded by Jean Bart, locates and rescues three French ships that had been captured by the Dutch Republic in late May. Bart fights a larger force commanded by Hidde Sjoerds de Vries, who dies of his wounds after being captured.

=== July–September ===
- July 27 – The Bank of England is founded through Royal charter by the Whig-dominated Parliament of England, following a proposal by Scottish merchant William Paterson to raise capital, by offering safe and steady returns of interest guaranteed by future taxes. A total of £1.2 million is raised for the war effort against Louis XIV of France by the end of the year, to establish the first-ever government debt.
- August 6 – The coronation of Sultan Husayn of the Safavid dynasty as the Shah of Persia takes place in Isfahan, eight days after the death of his father Suleiman I.
- August 24 – The Dictionnaire de l'Académie française, the first official dictionary of the French language, is presented by Jacques de Tourreil and Academy members on behalf of the Académie française to King Louis XIV.
- September 5 – The Great Fire of Warwick breaks out in England and destroys half the town. Donors raise £110,000 toward disaster relief, with Queen Anne contributing £1,000.
- September 8 – The 1694 Irpinia–Basilicata earthquake causes widespread severe damage and over 6,000 deaths in the Kingdom of Naples.
- September 27 – A hurricane hits Carlisle Bay, Barbados, sinking 27 British ships and resulting in 3,000 casualties.

=== October–December ===
- October 19 – A major windstorm begins and continues for several days, spreading the Culbin Sands over a large area of farmland in the Scottish Highlands in the County of Moray and burying the now-abandoned village of Culbin.
- October 23 – British/American colonial forces, led by Sir William Phips, fail to seize Quebec from the French.
- October 25 – Queen Mary II of England founds the Royal Hospital for Seamen at Greenwich.
- November 12 – The Army of Algeria captures Tunis, the capital of Tunisia, after a siege of three months, bringing an end to the Tunisian–Algerian War. Mohamed Bey El Mouradi, the Bey of Tunis, flees southward while Prince Muhammad ben Cheker of Tunisia becomes the new Dey on behalf of the Dey of Algiers, Hadj Ahmed.
- December 3 – The Parliament of England passes the Triennial Act 1694, requiring general elections every three years.
- December 6 – Thomas Tenison is appointed Archbishop of Canterbury.
- December 16 – A total solar eclipse is visible across South America.

=== Date unknown ===
- The Lao empire of Lan Xang unofficially ends.
- The notorious voyage of the English slave ship Hannibal (part of the Atlantic slave trade out of Benin) ends with the death of nearly half of the 692 slaves aboard.
- Rascians establish the settlement which will become Novi Sad on the Danube.
- The Parker Tavern is built in Reading, Massachusetts.

=== January–March ===
- January 7 (December 28, 1694 O.S.) – The United Kingdom's last joint monarchy, the reign of husband-and-wife King William III and Queen Mary II comes to an end with the death of Queen Mary, at the age of 32. Princess Mary had been installed as the monarch along with her husband and cousin, Willem Hendrik von Oranje, Stadtholder of the Dutch Republic, in 1689 after King James II was deposed by Willem during the "Glorious Revolution".
- January 14 (January 4 O.S.) – The Royal Navy warship HMS Nonsuch is captured near England's Isles of Scilly by the 48-gun French privateer Le Francois. Nonsuch is then sold to the French Navy and renamed Le Sans Pareil.
- January 24 – Milan's Court Theater is destroyed in a fire.
- January 27 – A flotilla of six Royal Navy warships under the command of Commodore James Killegrew aboard HMS Plymouth captures two French warships, the Content and the Trident, the day after the French ships had mistaken the English fleet to be a group of merchant ships to attack.
- February 6 – Mustafa II (1664 – 1703) succeeds his uncle, Ahmed II as Sultan of the Ottoman Empire.
- March 5 – The funeral of Queen Mary II of England takes place, accompanied by music written for the occasion by Henry Purcell.
- March 10 – Almost all French Army soldiers in a column of 1,300 troops, commanded by Brigadier General Urbain Le Clerc de Juigné, are killed or captured in the Battle of Sant Esteve d'en Bas against a smaller Spanish Empire force led by Ramon de Sala i Saçala during the War of the Grand Alliance.
- March 7 – John Trevor, Speaker of the English House of Commons, is expelled from the House by vote of the members, after being found guilty of accepting a bribe of 1000 pounds sterling from the City of London Corporation.
- March 14 – Paul Foley is elected as the new Speaker of the House after the expulsion of John Trevor.
- March 26 – John Hungerford is expelled from the English House of Commons when members vote to find him guilty of accepting a bribe in return for using his committee chairmanship to promote the pending Orphans Bill.

=== April–June ===
- April 17 – The House of Commons of England decides not to renew the Licensing Order of 1643, and states its reasoning, beginning with "Because it revives, and re-enacts, a Law which in no-wise answered the End for which it was made". The lifting of censorship creates a more open society, and an explosion of print results. Within 30 years, the number of printing houses in England increases from 20 to 103.
- April 22 – Sürmeli Ali Pasha is fired from his position as Grand Vizier of the Ottoman Empire, after coming into a disagreement with the new Sultan, Mustafa II. Sürmeli is initially sent into exile, but executed on the Sultan's orders on May 29.
- April 27 – Russo-Turkish War (1686–1700): Russia begins the Azov campaigns (1695–96) against the Ottoman Empire, with 31,000 troops departing to the Ottoman fortress at Azov on the Don River.
- May 18 – The 7.8 magnitude Linfen earthquake in Shanxi Province, Qing Dynasty kills over 50,000 people.
- June 11 – An annular eclipse of the sun is visible across South America.
- June 24 – The Commission of Enquiry into the Massacre of Glencoe in Scotland in 1692 reports to the Parliament of England, blaming Sir John Dalrymple, Secretary of State over Scotland, and declares that a soldier should refuse to obey a "command against the law of nature".

=== July–September ===
- July 12 – The Siege of Namur begins in the Spanish Netherlands (now Belgium).
- July 15 – The siege of the Ottoman fortress at Azaq by the Russian Army begins, but is unsuccessful and is discontinued after October 2 (September 22 O.S.).
- July 17 – The Bank of Scotland is founded.
- August 8 – The Wren Building is started in Williamsburg, Virginia (completed in 1700).
- August 10 – A naval skirmish occurs between English and Swedish ships in the Strait of Dover
- August 13–15 – Nine Years' War: Brussels is bombarded by French troops.
- September 1 – Nine Years' War: France surrenders Namur, Spanish Netherlands to forces of the Grand Alliance, led by King William III of England, Stadtholder of the Dutch Republic, following the 2-month Siege of Namur.
- September 7 – English pirate Henry Every perpetrates one of the most profitable raids in history, with the capture of the Grand Mughal ship Ganj-i-Sawai. In response, Emperor Aurangzeb threatens to put an end to all English trading in India.
- September 24 – All but eight of the remaining 305 crew of the Royal Navy ship HMS Winchester (1693) are killed when the ship founders in the Florida Keys. According to the ship's logbook, an epidemic of yellow fever began on August 1 and had killed 45 people before the hurricane struck, and left all but seven crew members too ill to walk.

=== October–December ===
- October 11 – King William III of England dissolves Parliament in the wake of a scandal involving former Speaker of the House of Commons John Trevor and other Tory MPs.
- October 25 – The 48-gun English Navy ship HMS Berkeley Castle is captured by the French Navy.
- November 22 – The new Parliament, with 513 members of the House of Commons is opened by King William III. Commons is composed of 257 Whigs (who hold a majority of one), 203 Tories and 53 members of other parties or independents.
- December 6 – A total eclipse of the sun is visible across the Middle East and western Asia.
- December 31 – A window tax is imposed in England. Some windows are bricked up to avoid it.

=== Date unknown ===
- English manufacturers call for an embargo on Indian cloth, and silk weavers picket the House of Commons of England.
- A £2 fine is imposed for swearing in England.
- After 23 years of construction, Spain completes Castillo de San Marcos to protect St. Augustine, Florida, from foreign threats.
- After many years of construction, the Potala Palace in Lhasa is completed.
- Gold is discovered in Brazil.
- Johanne Nielsdatter is executed for witchcraft, the last such confirmed execution in Norway.
- In Amsterdam, the bank Wed. Jean Deutz & Sn. floats the first sovereign bonds on the local market. The scheme is designed to fund a 1.5 million guilder loan to the Holy Roman Emperor. From this date on, European leaders commonly take advantage of the low interest rates available in the Dutch Republic, and borrow several hundred millions on the Dutch capital market.
- A large unidentified tropical volcanic eruption causes colder temperatures, crop failure, food shortage and mortality in north-western Europe.
- A naval skirmish occurs between English and Swedish ships en-route to Portugal.
- The Great Famine of 1695–1697 begins as the Great Famine of Estonia (1695–97) in Swedish Estonia and spreads across Finland, Latvia, Norway and Sweden, while the "seven ill years" of famine in Scotland are ongoing.

=== January–March ===
- January 21 – The Recoinage Act, passed by the Parliament of England to pull counterfeit silver coins out of circulation, becomes law.
- January 27 – In England, the ship HMS Royal Sovereign (formerly Sovereign of the Seas) catches fire and burns at Chatham, after 57 years of service.
- January 31 – In the Netherlands, undertakers revolt after funeral reforms in Amsterdam.
- January – Colley Cibber's play Love's Last Shift is first performed in London.
- February 8 (January 29 old style) – Peter the Great, who had jointly reigned since 1682 with his mentally ill older half-brother Tsar Ivan V, becomes the sole Tsar of Russia when Ivan dies at the age of 29.
- February 15 – A plot to ambush and assassinate King William III of England in order to restore King James and the House of Stuart to the throne is foiled when the king cancels his usual plan to return from a hunting trip by way of the road between Turnham Green and Brentford. The king's guard is alerted by the Earl of Portland, William Bentinck, who had been approached on February 13 by Sir Thomas Prendergast.
- February 23 – A royal proclamation is issued to arrest suspected Jacobite conspirators who had plotted the assassination of King William III, including gunman Robert Charnock and organizers George Barclay, and Sir John Fenwick. Barclay eludes capture, but Charnock and Fenwick are executed.
- March 7 – King William III of England departs from the Netherlands.
- March 9 – Spanish missionaries in the province of Santa Fe de Nuevo México in North America first learn of plans for a revolt among the Pueblo Indians and send warnings to the governor, asking for Spanish troops. The uprising begins on June 4.
- March 16 – The Dutch bombard Givet during the Nine Years' War.
- March 18 – Robert Charnock, who had been arrested for the Jacobite plot to kill King William is hanged at the Tower of London.

=== April–June ===
- April 23 – Russo-Turkish War (1686–1700): Russia begins the second of the Azov campaigns (1695–96).
- April – A fire destroys the Gra Bet (Left Quarter) of Gondar, the capital of Ethiopia. The fire starts "in the house of a prostitute" and destroys many buildings, including the churches of St. George, Takla Haymanot and Iyasu.
- May 1 – A partial solar eclipse is visible in western Canada and Greenland.
- May 16 – A total lunar eclipse is visible in western Europe and Africa.
- May 31 – John Salomonsz is elected chief of Sint Eustatius in the Caribbean Netherlands.
- June 4 – A second Pueblo Revolt occurs in Santa Fe de Nuevo México. The Tiwas of Taos and Picuris, the Tewas of San Ildefonso and Nambe, the Tanos of Jemez and San Cristobal, and the Keres of Santo Domingo and Cochiti attack during the full moon and kill 21 Spanish civilians and five priests.
- June 12 – China's Kangxi Emperor leads troops in the Battle of Jao Modo, about 37 miles (60 km) from the modern Mongolian capital, Ulan Bator, and defeats 5,000 Mongolian troops of the Dzungar Khanate under the command of Galdan Boshugtu Khan.
- June 17
  - The throne of the Polish–Lithuanian Commonwealth becomes vacant with the death of Jan Sobieski, prompting a competition between Friedrich Augustus, Elector of Saxony and Prince François Louis of France to compete under the commonwealth's "Golden Liberty" system for an elective monarchy of the new king by the nobility. Jerzy Albrecht Denhoff, the Grand Chancellor, remains the head of the Polish-Lithuanian government during the vacancy of the ceremonial throne.
  - Seven French ships attack five Dutch ships escorting a convoy of 112 merchant ships in the Battle of Dogger Bank.

=== July–September ===
- July 18 – Azov campaign: The Russian fleet occupies Azov at the mouth of the river Don.
- August 13 – The Dutch state of Drenthe makes William III of Orange its Stadtholder.
- August 22 – Forces of the Republic of Venice and the Ottoman Empire clash near Andros.
- August 29 – King Louis XIV of France and Victor Amadeus, Duke of Savoy, sign the Treaty of Turin, ending Savoy's involvement in the Nine Years' War.
- September 8 – The Parliament of Scotland passes the Education Act 1696, providing for locally funded, Church-supervised schools to be established in every parish in Scotland.
- September 11 – England's Royal Navy scuttles and deliberately sinks its 32-gun battleship HMS Sapphire in Bay Bulls Harbour in Newfoundland, rather than let it be captured by the French Navy following a disastrous battle.
- September 17 – On Canada's Hudson Bay, the English Navy recaptures the York Factory from France, three years after the French had captured it, and renamed the site "Fort Bourbon".

=== October–December ===
- October 7 – The Convention of Vigevano is signed, bringing a general ceasefire in Italy and an end to the Nine Years' War between France and the remaining members of the Grand Alliance.
- October 20 – The Imperial Russian Navy is founded on the recommendation of Tsar Peter the Great and approval by the Russian Duma.
- November 9 – A total lunar eclipse is visible in North and South America.
- November 12 – Hand in Hand Fire & Life Insurance Society, as predecessor to Aviva, is founded in England.
- November 21 – John Vanbrugh's play The Relapse is first performed in London.
- November 25 – In England, the House of Commons approves the bill of attainder to convict Sir John Fenwick of high treason for plotting to lead the assassination of and coup d'état against King William III, on its third and final reading, voting 187 to 161 in favor of conviction. The measure then moves to the House of Lords.
- November 30 – Pierre Le Moyne d'Iberville captures and destroys St. John's, Newfoundland after a three-day siege.
- December 7 – Connecticut Route 108, one of Connecticut's oldest highways is laid-out to Trumbull.
- December 19 – Jean-François Regnard's verse comedy Le Joueur ("The Gamester") premieres in Paris.
- December 23 – By a vote of 66 to 60, the English House of Lords approves the bill of attainder for the conviction of Sir John Fenwick for high treason. Fenwick is beheaded on January 28, 1697.
- December 24 – The Inquisition in Portugal carries out the sentence of burning at the stake against several Marrano Jews in Évora.

=== Date unknown ===
- The Great Famine of 1695–1697 wipes out almost a third of the population of Finland, while the Great Famine of Estonia (1695–97) takes out a fifth of the population of Estonia; and the "seven ill years" of famine in Scotland are ongoing.
- Polish replaces Ruthenian as an official language of the Grand Duchy of Lithuania.
- Abington, Pennsylvania, is settled.
- William Penn offers an elaborate plan for intercolonial cooperation largely in trade, defense, and criminal matters.
- Edward Lloyd probably begins publication of Lloyd's News, a predecessor of Lloyd's List, in London.
- Window tax was introduced in England and Wales and remained in force until 1851.
- A New Theory of the Earth, a book by William Whiston, is published and is well received by intellectuals of the day.
- The Bank of Scotland becomes the first bank in Europe to successfully issue paper currency.

=== January–March ===
- January 8 – Thomas Aikenhead is hanged outside Edinburgh, becoming the last person in Great Britain to be executed for blasphemy.
- January 11 – French writer Charles Perrault releases the book Histoires ou contes du temps passé (literally "Tales of Past Times", known in England as "Mother Goose tales") in Paris, a collection of popular fairy tales, including Cinderella, Puss in Boots, Red Riding Hood, The Sleeping Beauty and Bluebeard.
- February 22 – Gerrit de Heere becomes the new Governor of Dutch Ceylon, succeeding Thomas van Rhee and administering the colony for almost six years until his death.
- February 26 – Conquistador Martín de Ursúa y Arizmendi and 114 soldiers arrive at Lake Petén Itzá in what is now Guatemala and begin the Spanish conquest of Guatemala with an attack on the capital of the Itza people there before moving northward to the Yucatan peninsula.
- March 9 – Grand Embassy of Peter the Great: Tsar Peter the Great of Russia sets out to travel in Europe incognito, as Artilleryman Pjotr Mikhailov.
- March 13 – The Spanish conquest of Petén, and of Yucatán, is completed with the fall of Nojpetén, capital of the Itza Maya Kingdom, the last independent Maya state.
- March 22 – Charles II of Spain issues a Royal Cedula extending to the indigenous nobles of the Spanish Crown colonies, as well as to their descendants, the preeminence and honors customarily attributed to the Hidalgos of Castile.
- March 26 – Safavid occupation of Basra: Safavid government troops take control of Basra.

=== April–June ===
- April 5 – Charles XII becomes king of Sweden at age 14 on the death of his father, Charles XI, from stomach cancer.
- April 23 – As Chinese troops from the Manchu Dynasty (ruled by the Kangxi Emperor) complete their conquest of Mongolia, Galdan Boshugtu Khan, ruler of the last part of Mongolia to be conquered, the Dzungar Khanate, poisons himself, ending the resistance to conquest.
- May 6 – General Bernard Desjean, Baron de Pointis of France carries out an attack and pillaging of the Spanish South American fort of Cartagena de Indias (now in Colombia) with 1,200 soldiers and 650 pirate mercenaries. The French attackers overwhelm the city for the next 18 days. The Baron reneges on a contract to share the wealth with the pirates, who will come back to Cartagena a second time and makes a more violent attack.
- May 17 (May 7 Old Style) – The 13th century royal Tre Kronor ("Three Crowns") castle in Stockholm burns to the ground, and a large portion of the royal library is destroyed.
- June 2 – Augustus, Elector of Saxony converts to Roman Catholicism in order to be eligible to rule Poland.
- June 10 – The last mass execution for witchcraft in western Europe when the five Paisley witches are hanged and then burned in Scotland.
- June 27 – After becoming a Roman Catholic, Augustus the Strong is elected King Augustus II of Poland.
- June 30 – The earliest reported first-class cricket match takes place in Sussex in England.

=== July–September ===
- July 4 – A Byzantine icon, the "Weeping Madonna of Pócs", arrives in Vienna after a five-month journey following its forced removal from the Hungarian village of Pócs by order of the Holy Roman Emperor, Leopold I. It has been housed for more than 320 years in St. Stephen's Cathedral.
- July 6 – A major naval battle takes place between the Republic of Venice and the Ottoman Empire with each side having 25 battleships, supplemented by smaller vessels. The Venetian Navy, under the command of Admiral Bartolomeo Contarini, suffers 71 deaths and 163 injuries, and even worse casualties in a second engagement on September 20.
- July 27 – Mahmud Shah II, the Sultan of Johor and Pahang (now part of Malaysia) takes on full power upon the death of the regent, the Bendahara Paduka Raja. Mahmud II was only 10 years old when he became the Sultan upon the assassination of his father, Ibrahim Shah in 1685.
- July 28 – The opera Vénus et Adonis, composed by Henri Desmarets with libretto by Jean-Baptiste Rousseau, receives its first performance, premiering at the Théâtre du Palais-Royal in Paris.
- August 10 – The Siege of Barcelona ends in Spain after 52 days as Louis Joseph, Duke of Vendôme of France obtains the surrender of Barcelona from the Austrian General, Prince George of Hesse-Darmstadt.
- September 5 (August 25 O.S.) – During the Nine Years' War, the Battle of Hudson's Bay is fought between English and French ships in Hudson Bay near what is now the Canadian province of Manitoba; The French warship Pélican captures York Factory, a trading post of the English Hudson's Bay Company.
- September 11 – Battle of Zenta: Prince Eugene of Savoy crushes the Ottoman army of Mustafa II, and effectively ends Turkish hopes of recovering lost ground in Hungary.
- September 17 – Amcazade Köprülü Hüseyin Pasha becomes the new Grand Vizier of the Ottoman Empire in the wake of the disastrous Ottoman defeat at Zenta, replacing Grand Vizier Elmas Mehmed Pasha, who was killed in the battle by his own troops.
- September 20 – The Treaty of Ryswick is signed by France and the Grand Alliance, to end both the Nine Years' War and King William's War. Louis XIV of France recognises William III as King of England & Scotland, and both sides return territories they have taken in battle. In North America, the treaty returns Port-Royal (Acadia) to France.

=== October–December ===
- October 7 – The opera Issé, composed by André Cardinal Destouches with libretto by Antoine Houdar de la Motte, premieres at the Palace of Fontainebleau in France.
- October 16 – The Norwegian Code, promulgated by King Christian V of Denmark-Norway in 1687, is amended to provide for torture of condemned criminals in certain capital offenses in Norway, with permission for burning with hot irons, or cutting off the prisoner's right hand while the prisoner is being transported for decapitation.
- October 19 – Misión Loreto, the first Roman Catholic mission on Mexico's Baja California Peninsula, is founded by Spanish missionary Juan María de Salvatierra.
- October 24 – The first opéra-ballet, combining elements of both mediums of entertainment, is performed as L'Europe galante makes its debut at the Salle du Palais-Royal in Paris. Composed by André Campra, with libretto by Antoine Houdar de la Motte, the opera and ballet is conducted by Marin Marais.
- October 30 – The Nine Years' War, between France and the Grand Alliance comes to an end with the signing of the last pacts of the Peace of Ryswick in the Dutch city of Rijswijk as Leopold I of Austria accedes two days before a deadline that had been set by the other members of the Grand Alliance. The areas of the Duchy of Lorraine (Lotharingen), Freiburg im Breisgau, and Vieux-Brisach (Breisach) are returned by France to Leopold's control.
- November 24 – The elaborate burial of the late King Charles XI of Sweden takes place more than seven months after his April 5 death, with interment at the Riddarholmen Church on the island of Riddarholmen near Stockholm.
- November 30 – Prince Eugene of Savoy, a field marshal within the Holy Roman Empire, purchases a large tract of land in Vienna for construction of the Belvedere Palace.
- December 2 – The first service is held in St Paul's Cathedral since rebuilding work after the Great Fire of London began.
- December 7 – Louis, Duke of Burgundy, and Marie Adélaïde of Savoy marry in the royal chapel at the Palace of Versailles in France.
- December 8 – Tsangyang Gyatso is installed in Tibet as the 6th Dalai Lama in a ceremony at Lhasa, filling a vacancy that had existed since 1682.
- December 11 – A ball in the Hall of Mirrors at the Palace of Versailles is held to celebrate the Duke of Burgundy and Marie Adélaïde's wedding.
- December 14 – The coronation ceremony takes place for King Charles XII of Sweden.

=== Date unknown ===
- The Manchus of the Qing dynasty conquer Outer Mongolia.
- The Parliament of England passes the Trade with Africa Act 1697 (An Act to settle the Trade to Africa), which end the Royal African Company's monopoly on all English trade with Africa.
- William Dampier's A New Voyage Round the World is published in England.
- Christopher Polhem starts Sweden's first technical school.
- Heinrich Escher, Mayor of Zürich, introduces chocolate to Switzerland from Brussels.
- Martin Mere, England's largest lake, is drained by sir Thomas Fleetwood for farmland.
- The use of "litters" (wheelless transports that carried by four servants) increases in Europe.

=== January–March ===
- January 1 – The Abenaki tribe and Massachusetts colonists sign a treaty, ending the conflict in New England.
- January 4 – The Palace of Whitehall in London, England is destroyed by fire.
- January 23 – George Louis becomes Elector of Hanover upon the death of his father, Ernest Augustus. Because the widow of Ernest Augustus, George's mother Sophia, was heiress presumptive as the cousin of Anne, Queen of Great Britain, and Anne's closest eligible heir, George will become King of Great Britain.
- January 30 – William Kidd, who initially seized foreign ships under authority as a privateer for the British Empire before becoming a pirate, becomes an outlaw and uses his ship, the Adventure Galley, to capture an Indian ship, the valuable Quedagh Merchant, near India.
- February 17 – The Maratha Empire fort at Gingee falls after a siege of almost nine years by the Mughal Empire as King Rajaram escapes to safety. General Swarup Singh Bundela, who led the scaling of the fortress walls and Gingee's capture, is rewarded by Mughal Emperor Aurangzeb with command of the area.
- March 8 – The Society for Promoting Christian Knowledge, the oldest Anglican mission organization in the world, is founded by English clergyman Thomas Bray and four other people at Lincoln's Inn in London, along with Sir Humphrey Mackworth, Maynard Colchester, Lord Guilford and John Hooke.
- March
  - English Bishop Jeremy Collier publishes his pamphlet A Short View of the Immorality and Profaneness of the English Stage, accusing several contemporary playwrights of undermining public morality in their popular comedies by using profanity, blasphemy and indecency.
  - Samuel Cranston becomes the governor of the Colony of Rhode Island and Providence Plantations.

=== April–June ===
- April 1 – Scottish pirate William Kidd and his crew arrive at Île Sainte-Marie off of the coast of Madagascar in Kidd's Adventure Galley bringing with them the cargo of the captured ships Quedagh Merchant and Rouparelle. Upon arrival, all but 13 of Kidd's crew desert to work for another pirate, Robert Culliford. The Adventure Galley, which is leaking and falling apart, sinks and the Rouparelle is sunk by the deserters. Kidd and his 13 henchmen depart on Quedah Merchant.
- April 10 – A total solar eclipse is visible in Central America.
- May 1 – The Banishment Act of 1697 goes into effect for Roman Catholic church officials in Ireland, having been the deadline for all "popish archbishops, bishops, vicars general, deans, jesuits, monks, friars, and other regular popish clergy" to have reported to Irish ports for deportation. Re-entry to Ireland after May 4, 1698, is a criminal offense with a penalty of 12 months imprisonment and expulsion, while a second re-entry is punishable by death as treason.
- May 4 – At the imperial capital at Inwa, Sanay Min of the Toungoo dynasty becomes the new King of Burma upon the death of his father, Minye Kyawhtin.
- May 17 – The British Royal Navy ship HMS Hastings, a 32-gun fifth rate, is launched.
- June 20 – An earthquake of magnitude 7.2–7.9 damages an extended region around Ambato, Ecuador, including the Tungurahua, Cotopaxi and Chimborazo provinces. Ambato and Latacunga are completely destroyed and several thousand casualties are reported.
- June 21 – John Churchill, Earl of Marlborough is reinstated in the English Army, with readmission to the Privy Council by King William III. On July 26, he is selected as one of the Lords Justice.
- June 22 – The executions of 57 leaders of the Streltsy uprising begin and continue until June 28.
- June 24 – The Trade with Africa Act 1697 goes into effect in English overseas possessions, ending the monopoly of the Royal African Company (RAC) on the triangular trade by opening it to any English merchants who pay a 10 percent fee to the RAC.

=== July–September ===
- July 2 – Thomas Savery patents the first steam engine.
- July 7 – The English House of Commons is dissolved and new elections are held between July 19 and August 10 for a parliament to be summoned on August 24.
- July 14 – Darien scheme: The first Scottish settlers leave for an ill-fated colony in Panama.
- July 25 – English engineer Thomas Savery obtains a patent for a steam pump.
- August 24 – King William III opens the newly elected House of Commons at Westminster.
- August 25 – Peter the Great arrives back in Moscow; General Patrick Gordon has already crushed the Streltsy Uprising, with 341 rebels sentenced to be decapitated.
- September 5
  - In an effort to move his people away from Asiatic customs, Tsar Peter I of Russia imposes a beard tax.
  - A charter is granted by King William III of England to the new East India Company of England, called "the New Company" or "the English Company" to break the monopoly that has existed in India since 1689 with the existing British East India Company.
- September 8 – The Polish–Lithuanian Commonwealth defeats the Tatars in the Battle of Podhajce, the last battle between the Ottoman Empire and the Polish and Lithuanians.

=== October–December ===
- October 11 – The Treaty of the Hague is signed between the Dutch Republic, England and France.
- October 24 – Iberville and Bienville sail from Brest to the Gulf of Mexico, to defend the southern borders of New France.
- November 2 – The Darien scheme Scottish settlers land in Panama and establish their ill-fated colony; 80% of them would die within the first year.
- November 14
  - The first Eddystone Lighthouse, built off Plymouth, England, is illuminated.
  - The Spanish king Carlos names his grandson Jozef Ferdinand as his heir.
- November 16 – A congress begins in Sremski Karlovci to discuss a treaty between the Ottoman Empire and the Holy League.
- November – Tani Jinzan, astronomer and calendar scholar, observes a fire destroy Tosa (now Kōchi) in Japan at the same time as a Leonid meteor shower, taking it as evidence to reinforce belief in the "Theory of Areas".
- December 8 – King William III of England issues a proclamation of "our most gracious pardon unto all such pirates in the East Indies, viz., all eastward of the Cape of Good Hope, who shall surrender themselves for piracies or robberies committed by them upon sea or land" before April 30, 1699, to Captain Thomas Warren, but specifically "excepting Henry Every, alias Bridgman, and William Kidd.
- December 9 – Francis Nicholson becomes the new British colonial governor of Virginia, succeeding Sir Edmund Andros.
- December 12 – Mombasa (referred to at the time as Fort Jesus, and now part of Kenya) falls under control of the Emirate of Oman, with Imam Sa'if ibn Sultan as the first Omani Governor.

=== Date unknown ===
- Bucharest becomes the capital of Wallachia (part of modern-day Romania).
- In Africa, Zanzibar is captured by Oman.
- The Whigs sponsor Captain Kidd of New York as a privateer against French shipping.
- Humphrey Hody is appointed regius professor of Greek at Oxford.
- Shepherd Neame Brewery founded.
- Ukraine suffers a great famine.
- Cinderella is made as a folktale

=== January–March ===
- January 5 – A violent earthquake damages the city of Batavia on the Indonesian island of Java, killing at least 28 people.
- January 20 – The Parliament of England (under Tory dominance) limits the size of the country's standing army to 7,000 'native born' men; hence, King William III's Dutch Blue Guards cannot serve in the line. By an Act of February 1, it also requires disbandment of foreign troops in Ireland.
- January 26 – The Republic of Venice, Polish–Lithuanian Commonwealth and Holy Roman Empire sign the Treaty of Karlowitz with the Ottoman Empire, marking an end to the major phase of the Ottoman–Habsburg wars. The treaty marks a major geopolitical shift, as the Ottoman Empire subsequently abandons its expansionism and adopts a defensive posture while the Habsburg monarchy expands its influence.
- February 4 – A group of 350 rebels in the Streltsy Uprising are executed in Moscow.
- March 2 – The Edinburgh Gazette is first published in Scotland.
- March 4 – Jews are expelled from Lübeck, Germany.
- March 26 – The first performance of Amadis de Grèce, an opera by French composer André Cardinal Destouches, takes place at the Académie Royale de Musique, Paris.
- March 31 – A total solar eclipse is visible across the southern Indian Ocean.

=== April–June ===
- April 13 – The 10th Sikh guru, Guru Gobind Singh, creates the Khalsa at Anandpur Sahib.
- May 1 – Pierre Le Moyne d'Iberville founds the first European settlement in the Mississippi River Valley, at Fort Maurepas (Ocean Springs, Mississippi).
- May 1 (O.S.) – A series of five student orations at the College of William & Mary precipitate the Colony of Virginia's capital moving from Jamestown to Middle Plantation, resulting in the establishment of Williamsburg.
- May 10 – Billingsgate Fish Market in London is sanctioned as a permanent institution by an Act of Parliament, with the provision "that after the tenth of May, 1699, Billingsgate Market should be, every day in the week except Sunday, a free and open market for all sorts of fish, and that it should be lawful for any person to buy or sell any sort of fish without disturbance."
- June 11 – England, France and the Dutch Republic agree on the terms of the Treaty of London (1700) (Second Partition Treaty) for Spain.
- June 14 – Thomas Savery demonstrates his first steam pump to the Royal Society of London.

=== July–September ===
- July 6 – Scottish-born pirate captain William Kidd is arrested and imprisoned in Boston, Province of Massachusetts Bay, after being tricked by his former patron New York Governor Richard Coote, 1st Earl of Bellomont.
- July 26 – William Dampier's expedition to New Holland (Australia), in HMS Roebuck, reaches Dirk Hartog Island, at the mouth of what he calls Shark Bay in Western Australia, and he begins producing the first known detailed record of Australian flora and fauna.
- August 25 – Christian V, King of Denmark–Norway since 1670, dies and is succeeded by his son, Frederick IV (to 1730).
- September 23 – A total solar eclipse is visible in the northern hemisphere across Europe, the Middle East and north India.

=== October–December ===
- October 3 – The Liverpool Merchant, the first slave ship to depart from the Port of Liverpool, sets sail for West Africa where it embarks hundreds of African slaves and sails for Barbados, arriving there on September 18, 1700 with 220 slaves on board.
- October 11 – The opera Marthésie, première reine des Amazones (Marthesia, First Queen of the Amazons), composed by André Cardinal Destouches, is performed for the first time, premiering at Fontainebleau near Paris.
- October – An edict by King Louis XIV establishes an office of police magistrate in almost every village in France, with the title of lieutenant general de police created.
- November 22 – The Treaty of Preobrazhenskoye, negotiated by Johann Patkul, is signed at a palace of the Tsar of Russia Peter the Great, and representatives of Augustus the Strong, Elector of Saxony, King of Poland and Elector of Saxony to provide for the partition of Swedish Empire between Saxony, the Polish-Lithuanian Commonwealth, the Kingdoms of Denmark-Norway and the Russian Empire. The attack on Sweden, which takes place on February 22, starts the Great Northern War.
- December 3 – Baron Jacob Hop is appointed as the treasurer-general of The Hague.
- December 10 – A major ice storm shuts down the city of Boston for a week and freezing rain brings down many tree branches and causes severe damage to orchards.
- December 20 – Peter the Great orders the Russian New Year changed, from September 1 (the start of the Byzantine year) to January 1.

== Births ==
1690

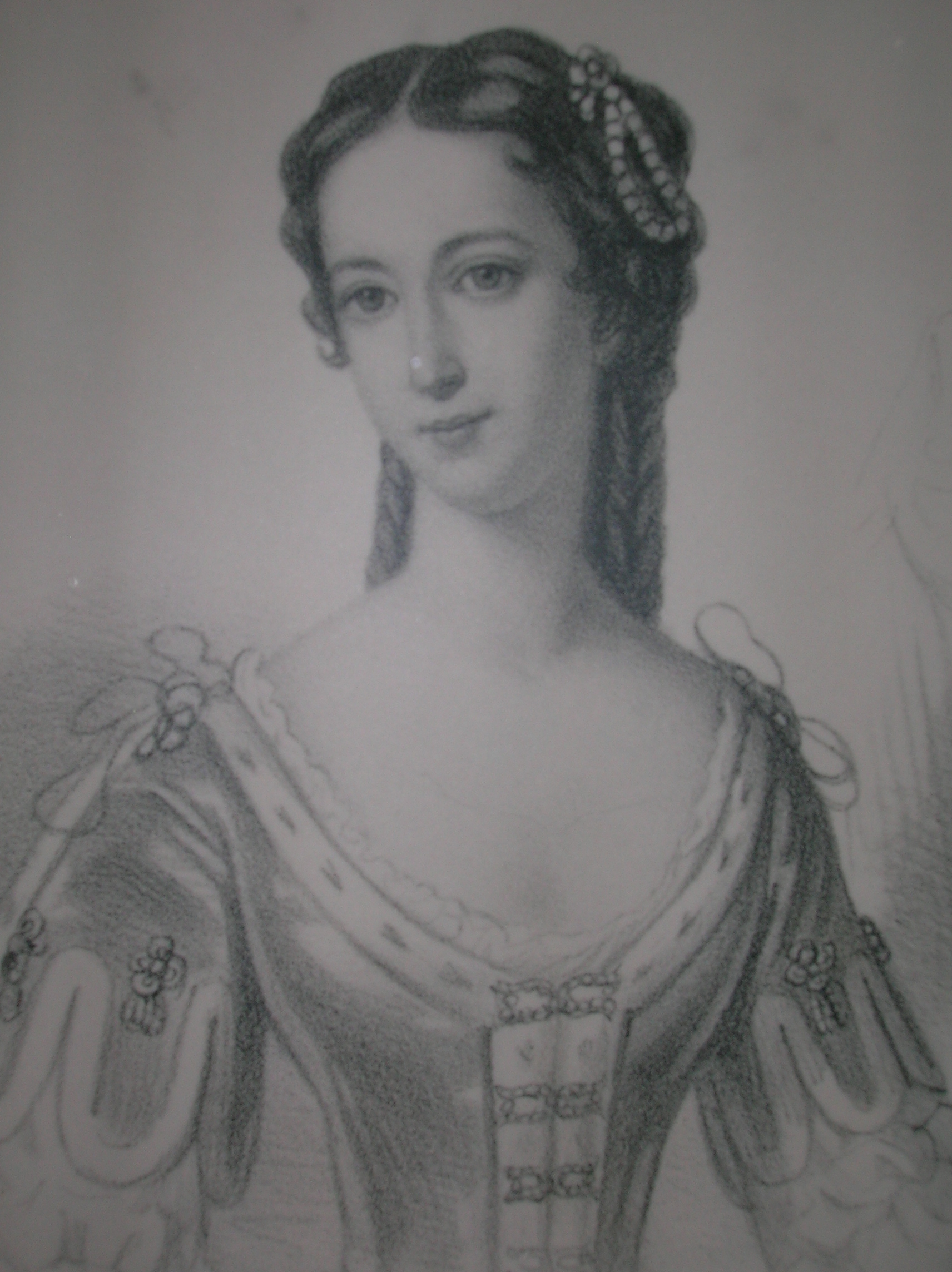
Susanna Montgomerie, Countess of Eglinton born 1 January

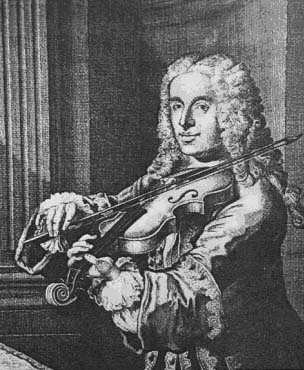
Francesco Maria Veracini born 1 February

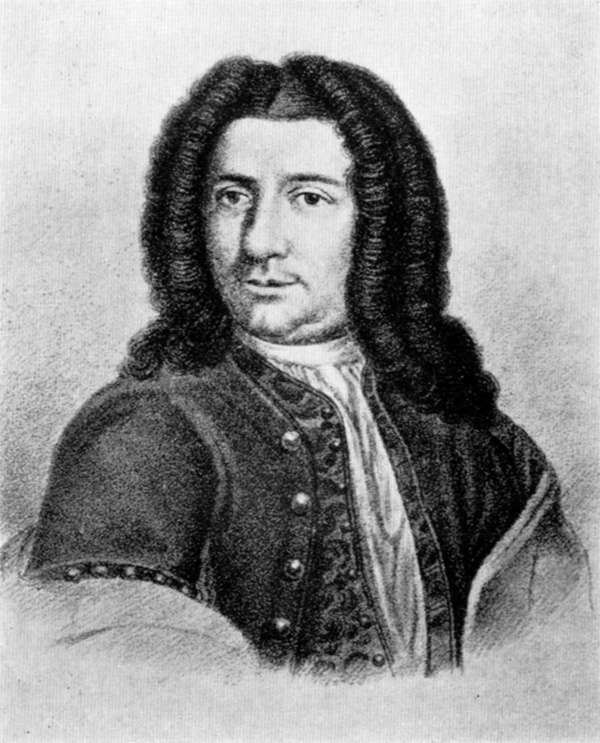
Kilian Stobæus born 6 February

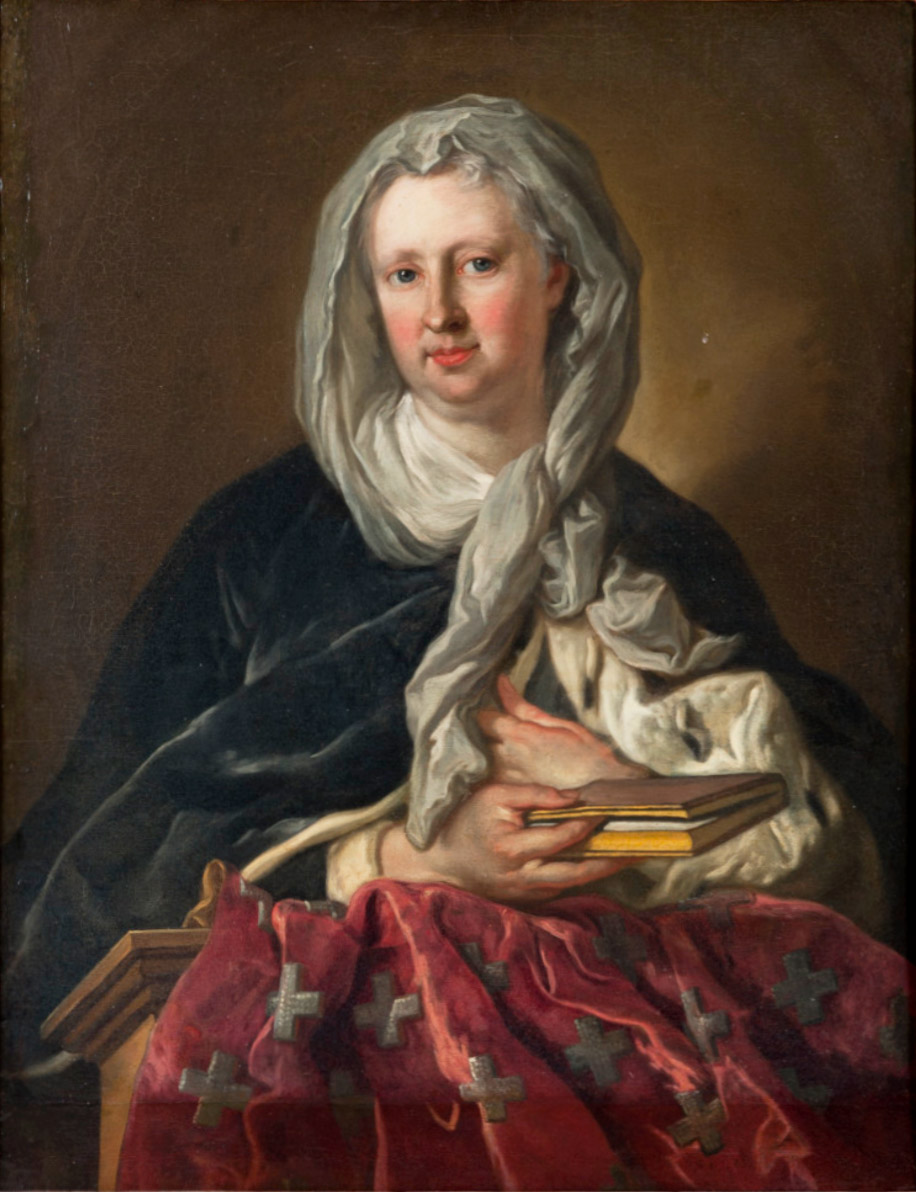
Maria Vittoria of Savoy born 9 February

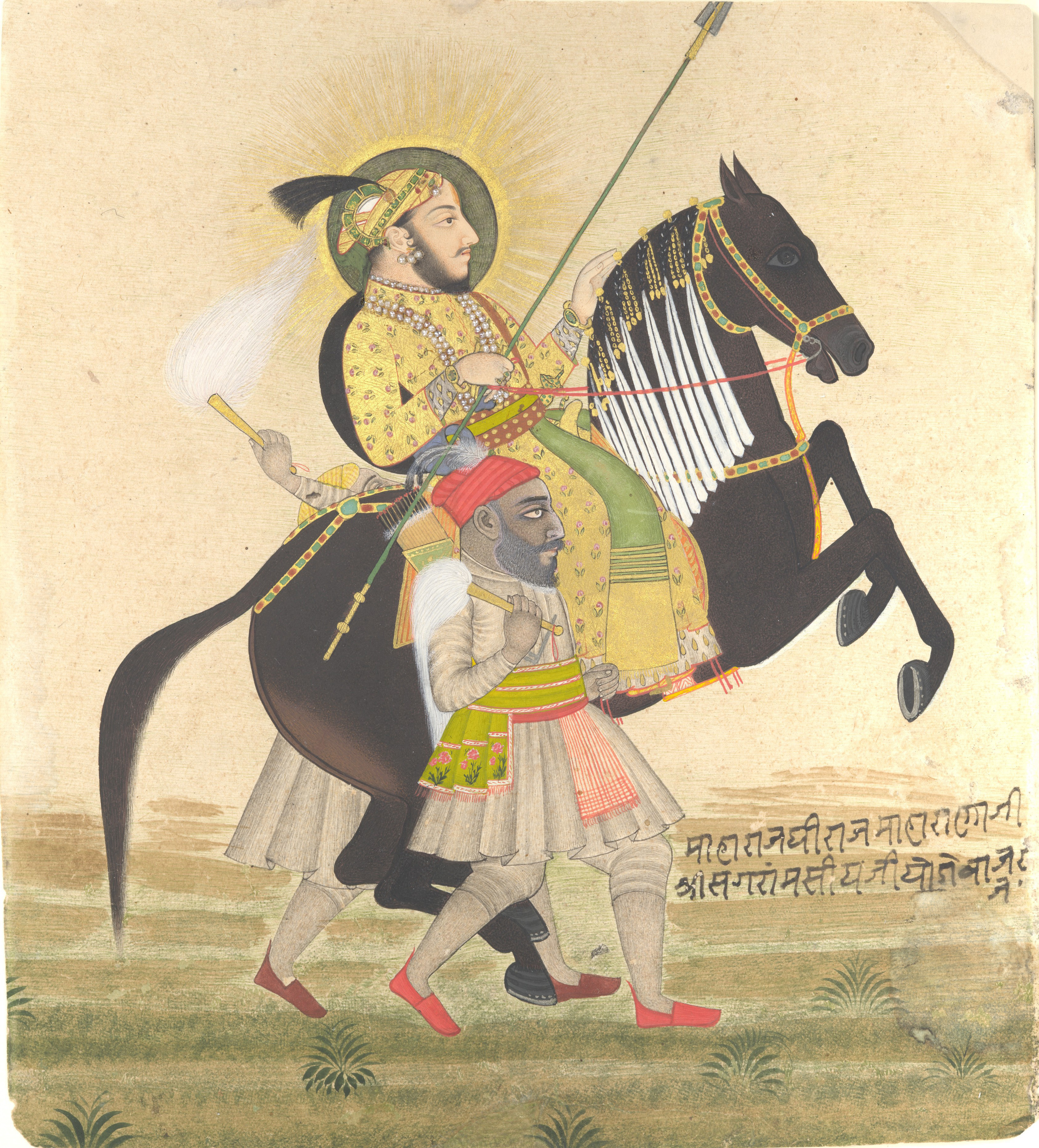
Sangram Singh II born 24 March

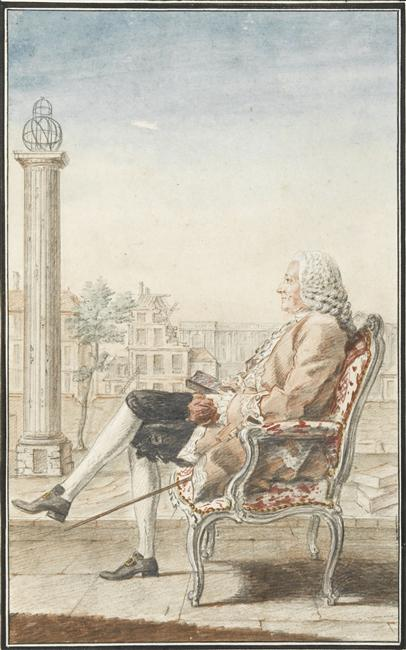
Louis Petit de Bachaumont born 2 June

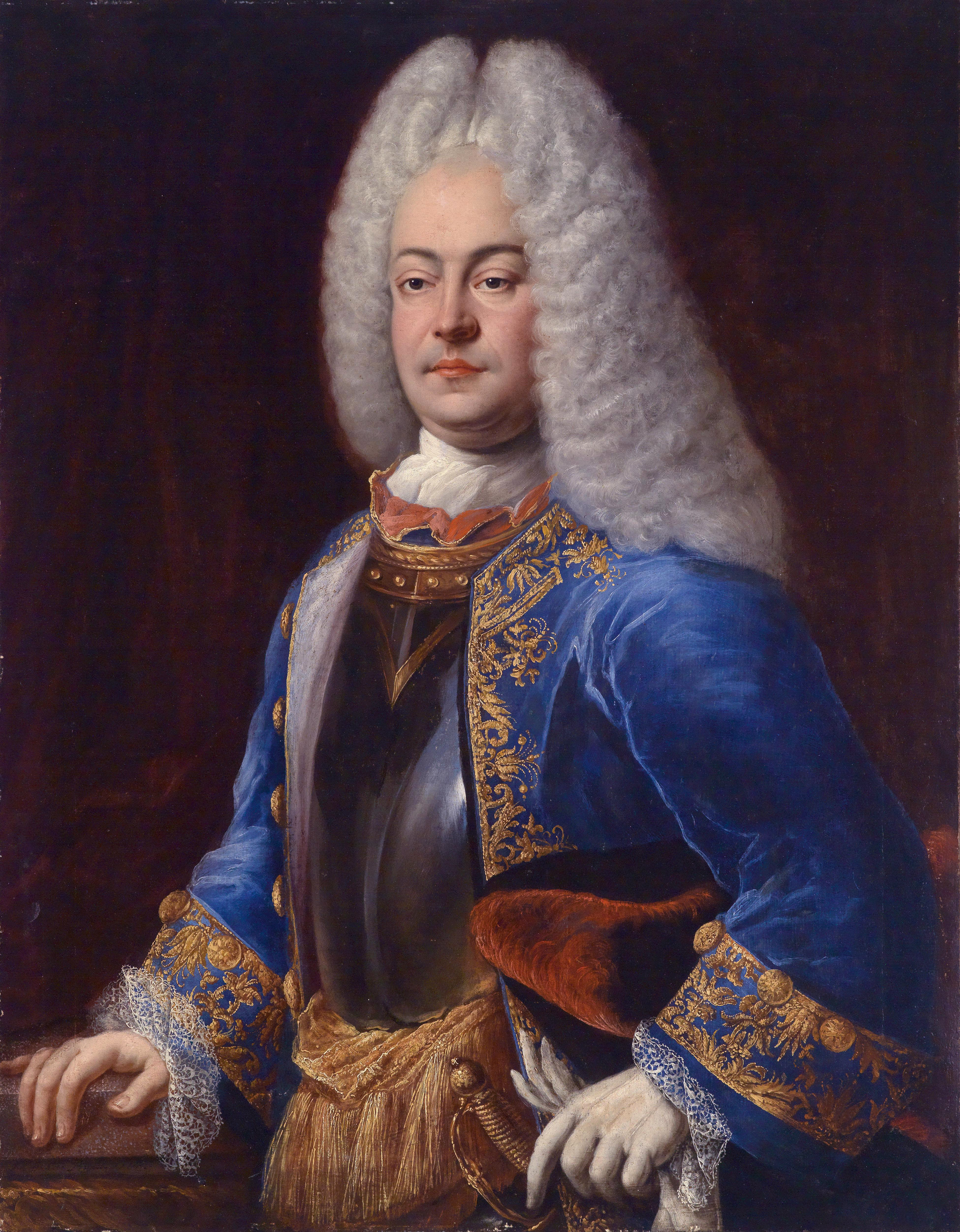
George Albert, Prince of East Frisia born 13 June

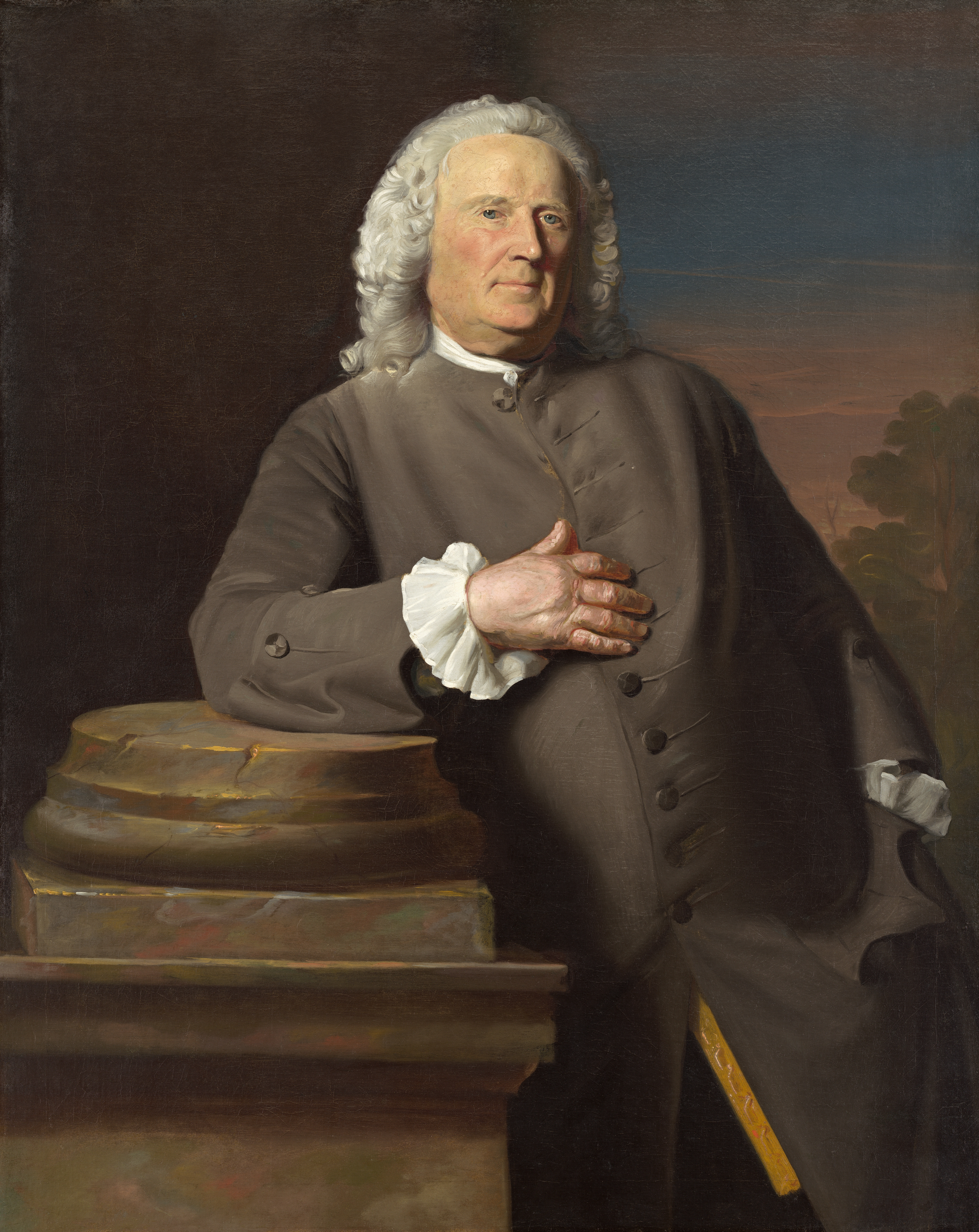
Epes Sargent (soldier) born 12 July

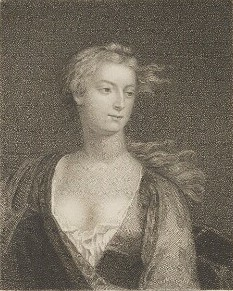
Martha Blount born 15 October

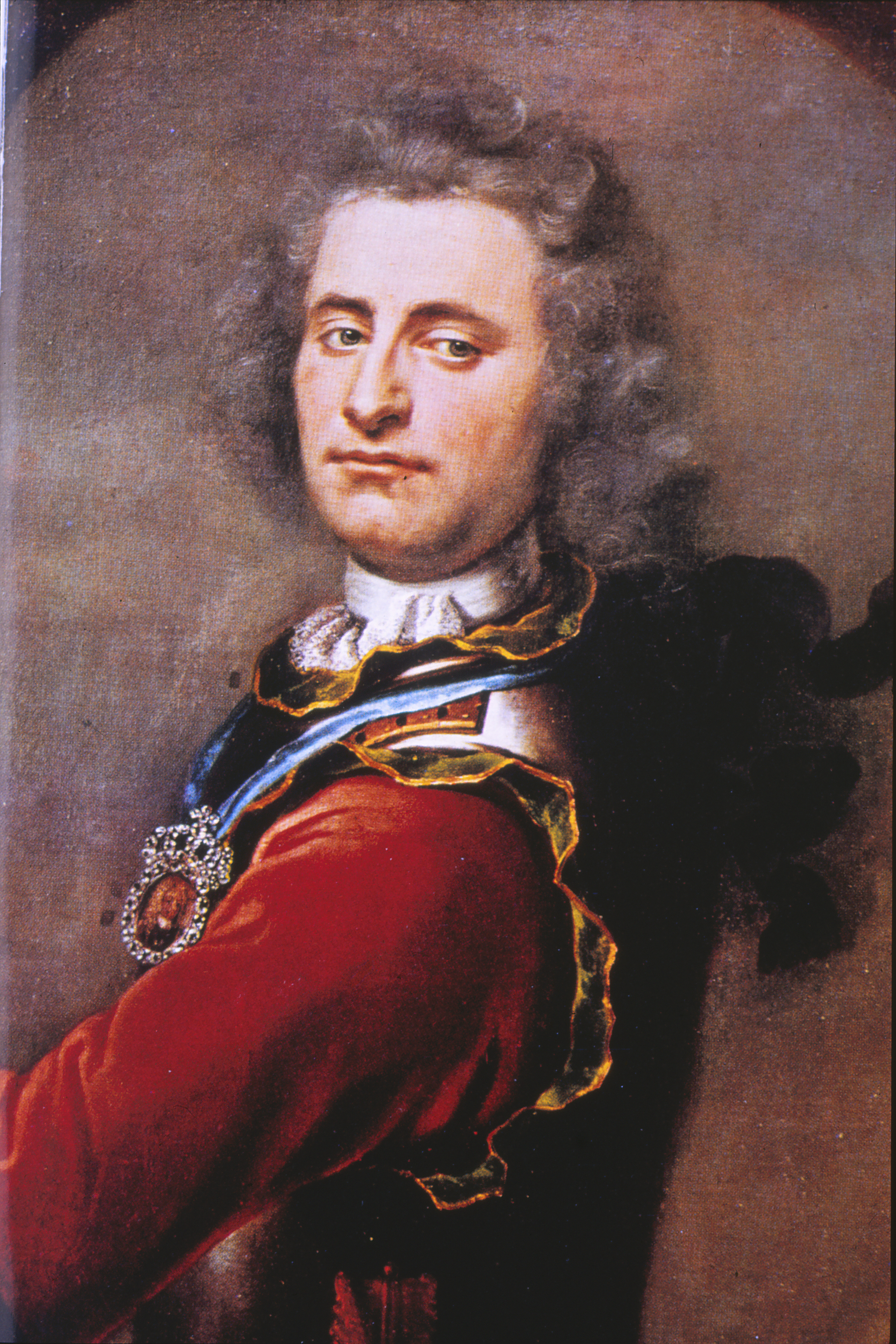
Peter Tordenskjold born 28 October

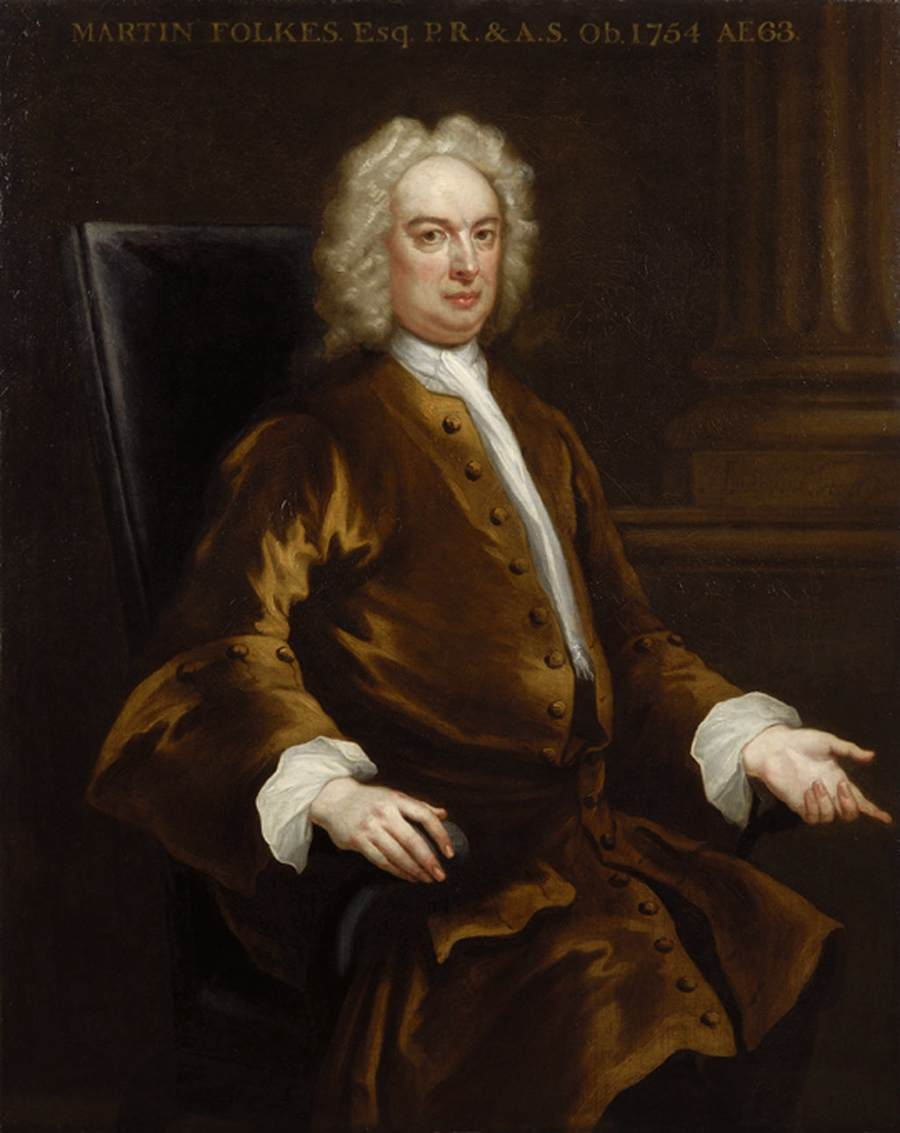
Martin Folkes born 29 October

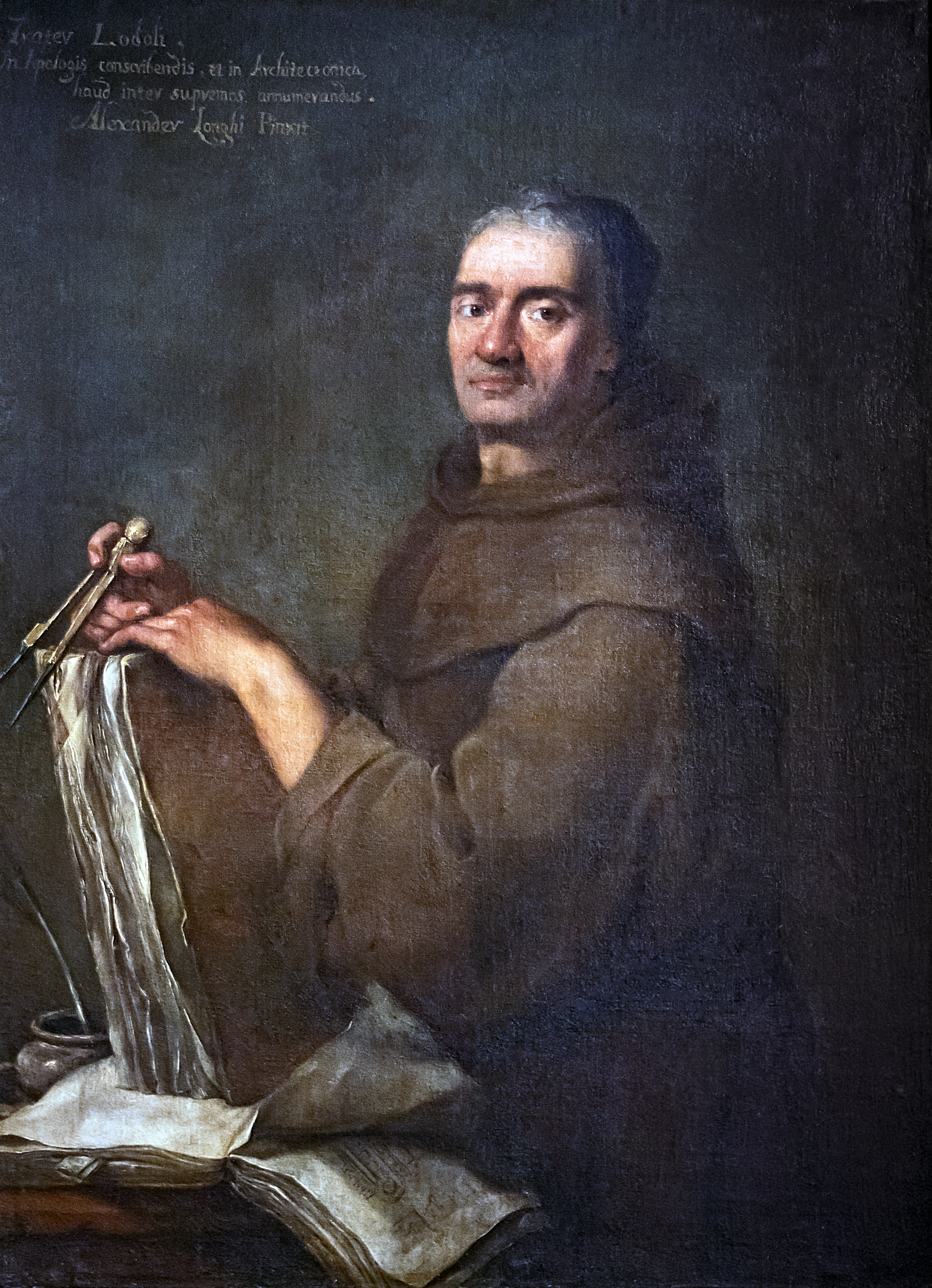
Carlo Lodoli born 28 November

=== January–March ===
- March 3 – Gilbert Livingston (d. 1746)
- January 1
  - Christian Falster, Danish writer (d. 1752)
  - Susanna Montgomerie, Countess of Eglinton, Scottish literary patron and society hostess (d. 1780)
- January 10 – William Smelt, British Member of Parliament (d. 1755)
- January 13 – Gottfried Heinrich Stölzel, Spanish musician (d. 1749)
- January 14
  - Lorenzo Fratellini, Italian painter (d. 1729)
  - Chrysostomus Hanthaler, Austrian historian (d. 1754)
- January 16 – Juan Curiel, Spanish intellectual and politician (d. 1775)
- January 17 – Peter Schnitler, Danish/Norwegian jurist and military officer (d. 1757)
- January 19 – William Duncombe, British translator (d. 1769)
- January 22 – Nicolas Lancret, French painter (d. 1743)
- January 24
  - Phineas Bowles, British Army officer (d. 1749)
  - James Ward, Anglican priest in Ireland (d. 1736)
- January 25 – Jean-Paul de Rome d'Ardène, French botanist, agronomist and priest (d. 1769)
- January 28 – Corbet Kynaston, British Member of Parliament (d. 1740)
- February 1 – Francesco Maria Veracini, Italian composer (d. 1768)
- February 3 – Richard Rawlinson, English minister, antiquarian (d. 1755)
- February 5 – Johann Daniel Schumacher, Russian scholar (d. 1761)
- February 6
  - Giovanni Battista Maini, Italian artist (d. 1752)
  - Kilian Stobæus, Swedish physician (d. 1742)
- February 7 – Charles Frederick II, Duke of Württemberg-Oels (d. 1761)
- February 9 – Maria Vittoria of Savoy, Italian princess (d. 1766)
- February 11 – Sir William Blackett, 2nd Baronet, British politician (d. 1728)
- February 14 – Jakob Ernst von Liechtenstein-Kastelkorn, Austrian archbishop (d. 1747)
- February 17
  - Marcello Papiniano Cusani, Italian archbishop (d. 1766)
  - Samuel Phillips, American clergyman (d. 1771)
- February 22 – Daniele Farlati, Italian Jesuit and historian (d. 1773)
- February 26 – Samuel van der Putte, Dutch traveler and explorer (d. 1745)
- February 28 – Alexei Petrovich, Tsarevich of Russia, Russian Tsarevich (d. 1718)
- March 1
  - Silvio Valenti Gonzaga, Catholic cardinal (d. 1756)
  - Victor Amadeus I, Prince of Carignano, Italian nobleman (d. 1741)
- March 10 – Johann Jakob Schmauss, German jurist (d. 1757)
- March 12 – George Lee, 2nd Earl of Lichfield, British peer (d. 1743)
- March 16 – Benjamin Elbel, German theologian (d. 1756)
- March 18 – Christian Goldbach, Prussian mathematician (d. 1764)
- March 23 – Casimir William of Hesse-Homburg, Prince of Hesse-Homburg (d. 1726)
- March 24 – Sangram Singh II, Maharana of Mewar (d. 1734)
- March 29 – John Montagu, 2nd Duke of Montagu, British duke (d. 1749)

=== April–June ===
- April 2 – Angelo Piò, Italian sculptor (d. 1769)
- April 8 – Domenico Maria Manni, Italian historian (d. 1788)
- April 9 – Johan Henrik Scheffel, Swedish artist (d. 1781)
- April 13 – Joachim Wagner, organ builder (d. 1749)
- April 14 – Jan Wandelaar, painter and engraver from the Northern Netherlands (d. 1759)
- April 15 – John Wallop, 1st Earl of Portsmouth, English politician and nobleman (d. 1762)
- April 20 – Giuseppe Gonzaga, Duke of Guastalla, Italian noble (d. 1746)
- April 22
  - John Carteret, 2nd Earl Granville, British statesman (d. 1763)
  - Robert Raikes the Elder, English printer (d. 1757)
- April 25 – Gottlieb Muffat, Austrian composer and organist (d. 1770)
- April 26 – Henri-Joseph Rega, physician and rector of the university of Leuven (d. 1754)
- May 1 – Luke Schaub, British diplomat (d. 1758)
- May 2 – Talbot Yelverton, 1st Earl of Sussex, British Earl (d. 1731)
- May 10 – Jean Moreau de Séchelles, French politician (d. 1761)
- May 14 – Jean Bouillet, French physician (d. 1777)
- May 25 – Joseph Johann Adam, Prince of Liechtenstein (d. 1732)
- May 30 – Anton Sturm, German sculptor (d. 1757)
- June 2 – Louis Petit de Bachaumont, French writer (d. 1771)
- June 3 – François de Pâris, Catholic priest and theologian (d. 1727)
- June 9 – Michel-Étienne Turgot, French lawyer (d. 1751)
- June 11 – Giovanni Antonio Giay, Italian composer (d. 1764)
- June 13 – George Albert, Prince of East Frisia (d. 1734)

=== July–September ===
- July 7 – Johann Tobias Krebs, German composer and organist (d. 1762)
- July 10 – Sir Henry Oxenden, 4th Baronet, British politician (d. 1720)
- July 12 – Epes Sargent, soldier (d. 1762)
- July 13 – Placidus Böcken, German lawyer (d. 1752)
- July 25 – Ferdinand von Plettenberg, German politician (d. 1737)
- August 3 – Jean Pâris de Monmartel, French private banker (d. 1766)
- September 4 – Polykarp Leyser IV, German academic (d. 1728)
- September 7 – Karl Heinrich von Bogatzky, German hymnwriter (d. 1774)
- September 8
  - Zachary Pearce, English bishop (d. 1774)
  - Lorenzo Zavateri, Italian baroque violinist (d. 1764)
- September 10 – Maeda Yoshinori, daimyo (d. 1745)
- September 12 – Peter Dens, Belgian Catholic theologian (d. 1775)
- September 15 – Ignazio Prota, Italian composer (d. 1748)
- September 18 – Charles Louis, Duke of Schleswig-Holstein-Sonderburg-Beck (d. 1774)
- September 23 – Giuseppe Bazzani, Italian painter (d. 1769)
- September 28
  - Jacques-Barthélemy Micheli du Crest, Genevan cartographer (d. 1766)
  - Michel Fourmont, French religious servant and professor (d. 1746)
  - James Murray, 2nd Duke of Atholl, British politician (d. 1764)

=== October–December ===
- October 9 – Robert Woodcock, English artist and composer (d. 1728)
- October 13 – Jean de Boullonges, French politician (d. 1769)
- October 14 – Léopold Philippe d'Arenberg, Austrian field marshal (d. 1754)
- October 15 – Martha Blount, friend of Alexander Pope (d. 1762)
- October 18 – Thomas Lewis, British politician (d. 1777)
- October 19 – Louis-Guillaume Verrier, Canadian lawyer (d. 1758)
- October 28 – Peter Tordenskjold, Norwegian sea officer (d. 1720)
- October 29 – Martin Folkes, English antiquary, numismatist, mathematician, astronomer (d. 1754)
- November 4 – Guillaume-Hyacinthe Bougeant, French Jesuit and writer (d. 1743)
- November 5
  - Carlo Giuseppe Merlo, Italian architect of the late-Baroque period (d. 1760)
  - Frederick Louis of Württemberg-Winnental, German army commander (d. 1734)
- November 7
  - Francisco Carriedo, General of Philippines (d. 1743)
  - Dominic Marquard, Prince of Löwenstein-Wertheim-Rochefort, German nobleman (d. 1735)
- November 10 – Christine Charlotte of Solms-Braunfels, Landgravine of Hesse-Homburg (d. 1771)
- November 13 – Ernst Johann von Biron, Duke of Courland and Semigallia (d. 1772)
- November 16 – John Brownlow, 1st Viscount Tyrconnel, Irish Viscount (d. 1754)
- November 17 – Noël-Nicolas Coypel, French painter (d. 1734)
- November 22 – François Colin de Blamont, French composer (d. 1760)
- November 24 (baptized) – Charles Theodore Pachelbel, German/American composer (d. 1750)
- November 28 – Carlo Lodoli, Italian architect (d. 1761)
- November 29 – Christian August, Prince of Anhalt-Zerbst, German general (d. 1747)
- December 1
  - Karl Philipp von Greifenclau zu Vollraths, German bishop (d. 1754)
  - Philip Yorke, 1st Earl of Hardwicke, English lawyer, politician, Lord Chancellor (d. 1764)
- December 2 – Robert Shafto, British politician (d. 1729)
- December 3 – José Maria da Fonseca e Évora, Franciscan friar and bishop, Portuguese Commissary General of the Franciscan Order (d. 1752)
- December 18 – Sir Edmund Isham, 6th Baronet, English baronet and Member of Parliament (d. 1772)
- December 22
  - Marie Anne Éléonore de Bourbon, French noble (d. 1760)
  - Meidingu Pamheiba, King of Manipur (d. 1751)
- December 25 – William Dicey (d. 1756)
- date unknown – Thomas Carter, Irish politician (d. 1763)

1691

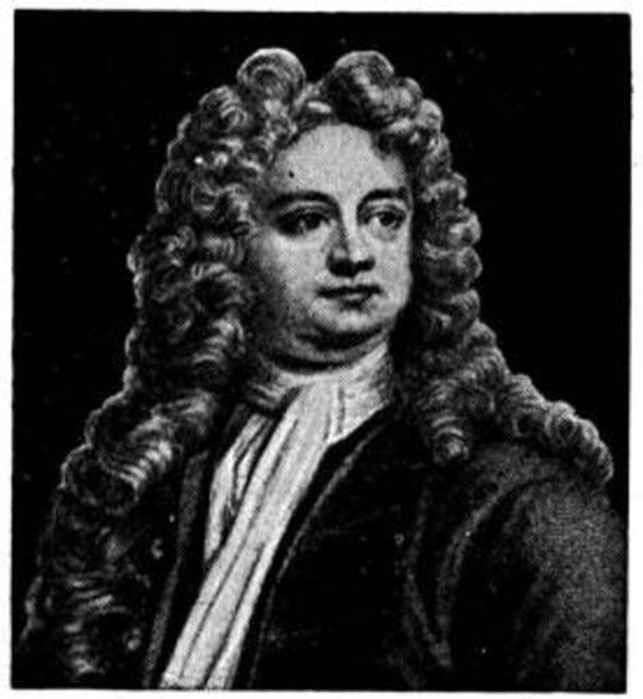
George Lillo born 3 February

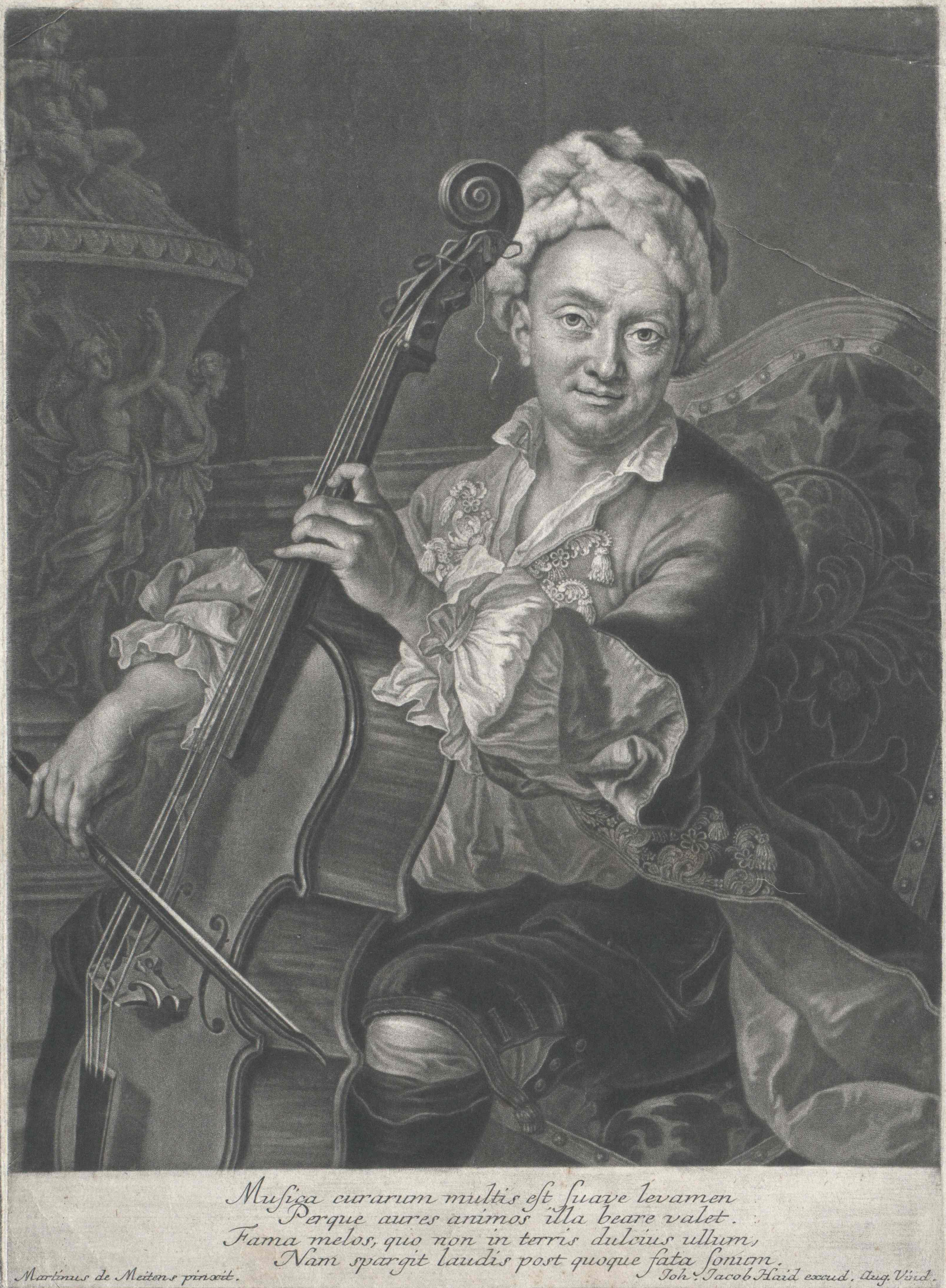
Francesco Alborea born 7 March

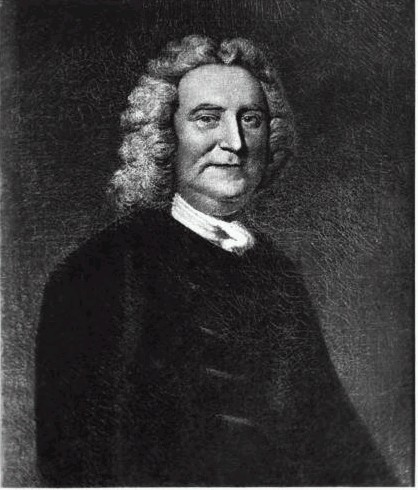
James Alexander (lawyer) born 27 May

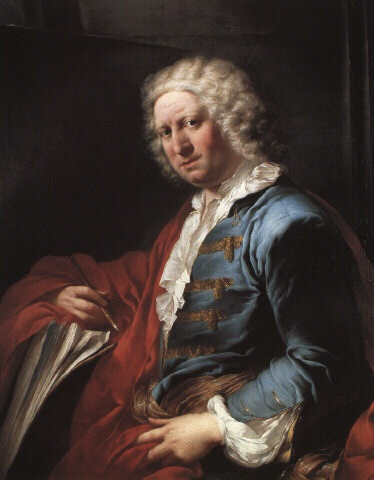
Giovanni Paolo Panini born 17 June

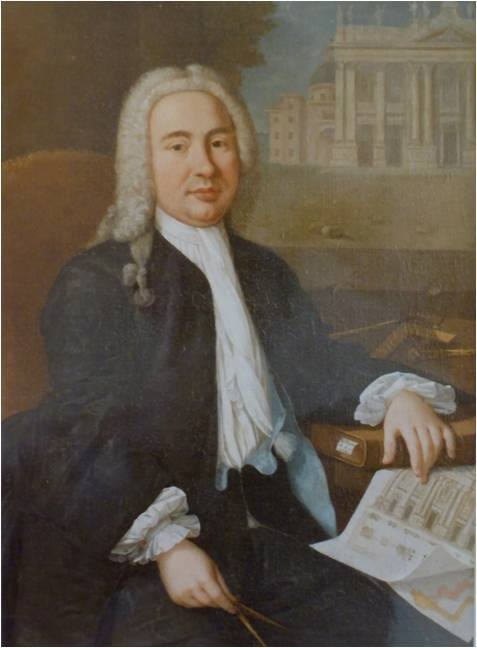
Alessandro Galilei born 25 August

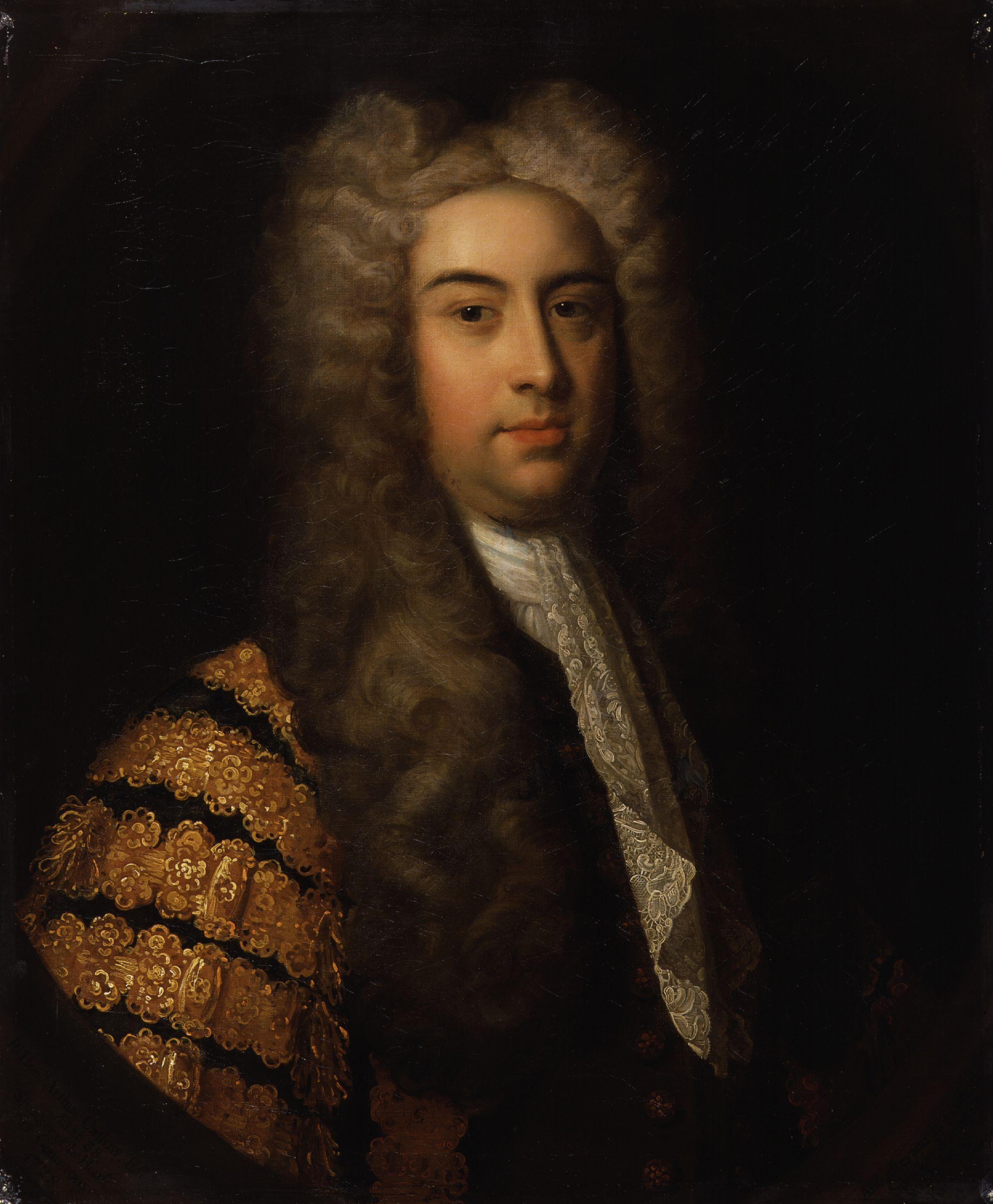
Arthur Onslow born 1 October

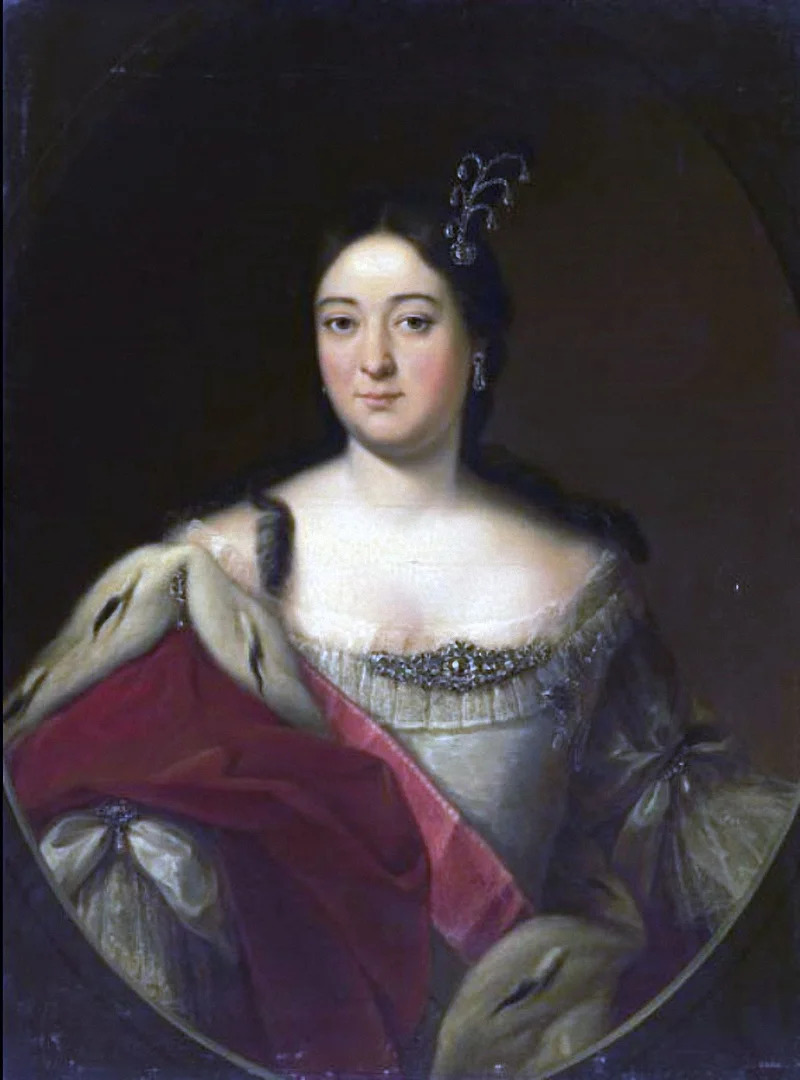
Tsarevna Catherine Ivanovna of Russia born 20 October

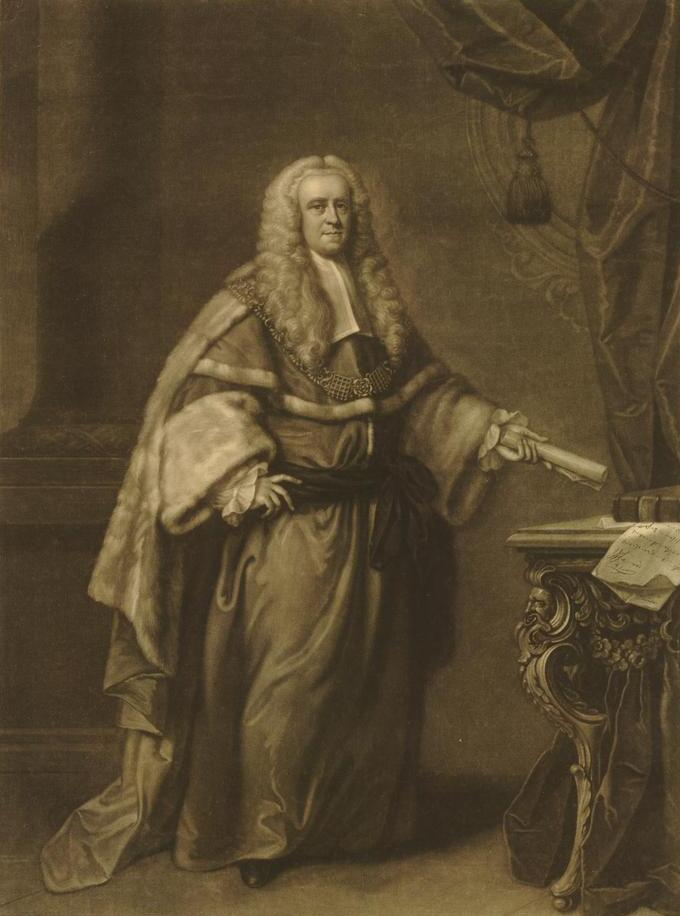
Dudley Ryder (judge) born 4 November

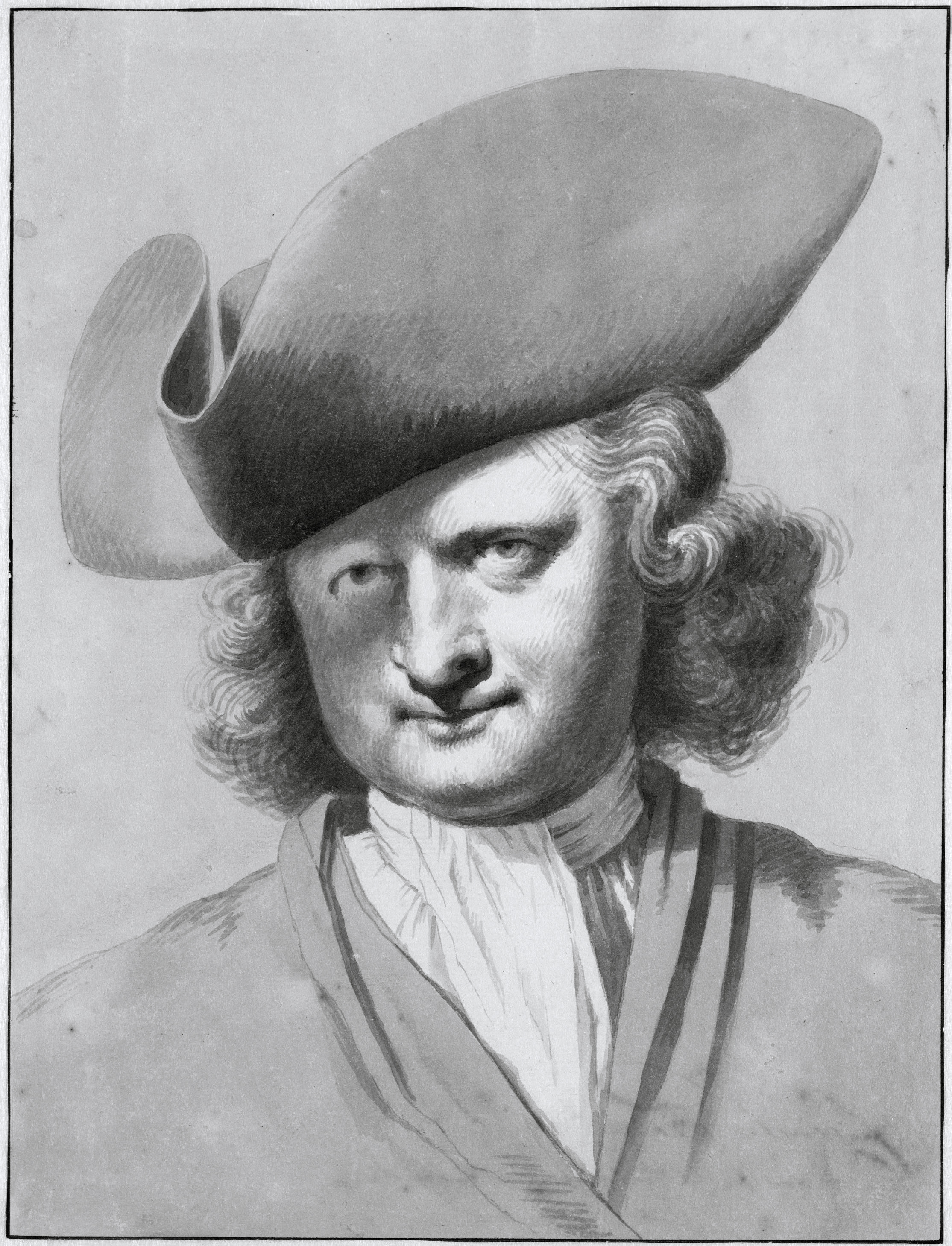
Cornelis Pronk born 10 December

=== January–March ===
- January 8 – George Charles of Hesse-Kassel, Prince of Hesse-Kassel and Prussian general (d. 1755)
- January 16 – Peter Scheemakers, Flemish sculptor (d. 1781)
- January 18 – William Finch, British diplomat (d. 1766)
- January 19 – Reinier Boitet, Delft publisher and writer (d. 1750)
- January 25 – John Folliot, officer of the British Army (d. 1762)
- January 27 – Christian Ulrich II, Duke of Württemberg-Wilhelminenort (d. 1734)
- February 3 – George Lillo, British writer (d. 1739)
- February 4 – Louis-Basile de Bernage, French jurist (d. 1767)
- February 6 – Francisco Cajigal de la Vega, Spanish general and Viceroy (d. 1777)
- February 8 – John Adams Sr., British colonial farmer, minister, father of the U.S. president, John Adams (d. 1761)
- February 10 – Samuel Wesley, English poet and cleric (d. 1739)
- February 17 – Julius Valentyn Stein van Gollenesse, Governor of Zeylan (d. 1755)
- February 27 – Edward Cave, English editor and publisher (d. 1754)
- March 1 – Conrad Beissel, German-American religious leader (d. 1768)
- March 4 – Pierre-Herman Dosquet, Catholic bishop (d. 1777)
- March 7 – Francesco Alborea, Italian composer and cellist (d. 1739)
- March 12 – Dionisia de Santa María Mitas Talangpaz, Filipino saint (d. 1732)
- March 16 – Michel Baudouin, Canadian missionary (d. 1768)
- March 20 – Princess Dorothea Wilhelmine of Saxe-Zeitz, Landgravine of Hesse-Kassel (d. 1743)
- March 22 – Philipp von Stosch, Prussian antiquarian (d. 1757)
- March 28 – Charles Emil Lewenhaupt, Swedish general (d. 1743)
- March 30 – Charles Hamilton, Count of Arran, English collector of manuscripts (d. 1754)
- March 31 – Franz Hunolt, German preacher (d. 1746)

=== April–June ===
- April 2 – Christian Ernest of Stolberg-Wernigerode, Count (d. 1771)
- April 5
  - Franz Joseph Spiegler, German painter (d. 1757)
  - Louis VIII, Landgrave of Hesse-Darmstadt (d. 1768)
- April 6 – Johann Heinrich Zopf, German historian (d. 1774)
- April 8 – John Bampfylde, British politician (d. 1750)
- April 9
  - Paul Egell, German sculptor and plasterer (d. 1752)
  - Johann Matthias Gesner, German classical scholar and schoolmaster (d. 1761)
- April 13
  - Joseph-Charles Roettiers, French engraver and medallist (d. 1779)
  - Johann Friedrich Weidler, German astronomer and mathematician (d. 1755)
- April 23 – René Hérault, French police chief (d. 1740)
- April 30 – Henry Ingram, 7th Viscount of Irvine, Scottish peer and politician (d. 1761)
- May 1 – Kasimir Wedig von Bonin, German military personnel (d. 1752)
- May 23 – Giuseppe Orsoni, Italian artist, 1691–1755 (d. 1755)
- May 25 – Infante Francisco, Duke of Beja, Portuguese prince of the second House of Braganza (d. 1742)
- May 27 – James Alexander, American lawyer in colonial New York (d. 1756)
- June 2 – Nicolau Nasoni, Italian architect (d. 1773)
- June 4 – Daniel Horsmanden, American judge (d. 1778)
- June 8 – James Cecil, 5th Earl of Salisbury, English Earl (d. 1728)
- June 14 – Jan Francisci, Slovak organist and composer (d. 1758)
- June 17
  - George August, Count of Erbach-Schönberg, German noble (d. 1758)
  - Giovanni Paolo Panini, Italian painter and architect (d. 1765)
- June 20 – Pietro Antonio Magatti, Italian painter (d. 1767)
- June 23 – John Thomas, English bishop of Lincoln and bishop of Salisbury (d. 1766)

=== July–September ===
- July 17 – Peder von Todderud, Danish autobiographer (d. 1772)
- July 24 – Harry Powlett, 4th Duke of Bolton, British politician (d. 1759)
- July 26 – Sir John Trelawny, 4th Baronet, British politician (d. 1756)
- July 31 – Bartolomé Rull, Spanish bishop (d. 1769)
- August 5 – Charles d'Orléans de Rothelin, French priest and scholar (d. 1744)
- August 8 – Christina Beata Dagström, Swedish baroness and glass works owner (d. 1754)
- August 21 – Anne Coventry, Countess of Coventry, English plaintiff in a marriage settlement case (d. 1788)
- August 25 – Alessandro Galilei, Italian architect, mathematician (d. 1737)
- August 28 – Elisabeth Christine of Brunswick-Wolfenbüttel, Holy Roman Empress consort (d. 1750)
- August 29 – Richard Challoner, English Catholic prelate (d. 1781)
- August 30 – Louis-Jean Lévesque de Pouilly, French philosopher (d. 1750)
- September 1 – James Burrough, English academic and architect (d. 1764)
- September 3
  - Ana Maria de Lorena, 1st Duchess of Abrantes, Portuguese noblewoman (d. 1761)
  - Armande Félice de La Porte Mazarin, French noblewoman, courtier and duelist (d. 1729)
  - Antoine-Alexis Perier de Salvert, French naval officer (d. 1757)
- September 20 – Giovanni Francesco Crivelli, Italian mathematician and priest (d. 1743)
- September 22 – Louis-Philippe de Rigaud, Marquis of Vaudreuil, French Navy officer (d. 1763)

=== October–December ===
- October 1 – Arthur Onslow, Speaker of the British House of Commons (d. 1768)
- October 6 – Sir Edward Turner, 1st Baronet, British Baronet (d. 1735)
- October 11 – John Leland, English Presbyterian minister (d. 1766)
- October 14 – John Lovewell, Nashua, New Hampshire hero (d. 1725)
- October 18 – Kaspar Ernst von Schultze, German military personnel (d. 1757)
- October 20 – Tsarevna Catherine Ivanovna of Russia, Tsarevna of Russia (d. 1733)
- October 27 – Jacob Severin, Dano-Norwegian merchant (d. 1753)
- November 4
  - William Bulkeley, sheriff and diarist from Anglesey (d. 1760)
  - Dudley Ryder, British politician and judge (d. 1756)
- November 9 – Antonio Francesco Gori, Italian antiquarian (d. 1757)
- November 10 – Wilhelm Heinrich, Duke of Saxe-Eisenach, German duke (d. 1741)
- November 11 – Peregrine Osborne, 3rd Duke of Leeds, British peer (d. 1731)
- November 14
  - James Lindsay, 5th Earl of Balcarres, Governor of Jamaica (d. 1768)
  - Henry Shirley, 3rd Earl Ferrers, British peer (d. 1745)
- November 18 – Mårten Triewald, merchant and technician, one of the founders of the Royal Swedish Academy of Sciences (d. 1747)
- November 19 – William Fraser, of Fraserfield, politician (d. 1727)
- November 21 – Domingo José Claros Pérez de Guzmán, 13th Duke of Medina Sidonia, noble (d. 1739)
- November 27 – Josef Antonín Plánický, Czech composer, choirmaster and singer (d. 1732)
- December 10 – Cornelis Pronk, Dutch painter (d. 1759)
- December 18 – Gaston-Laurent Coeurdoux, French Indianist and missionary (d. 1779)
- December 30 – Conrad Friedrich Hurlebusch, German Dutch composer and organist (d. 1765)

1692

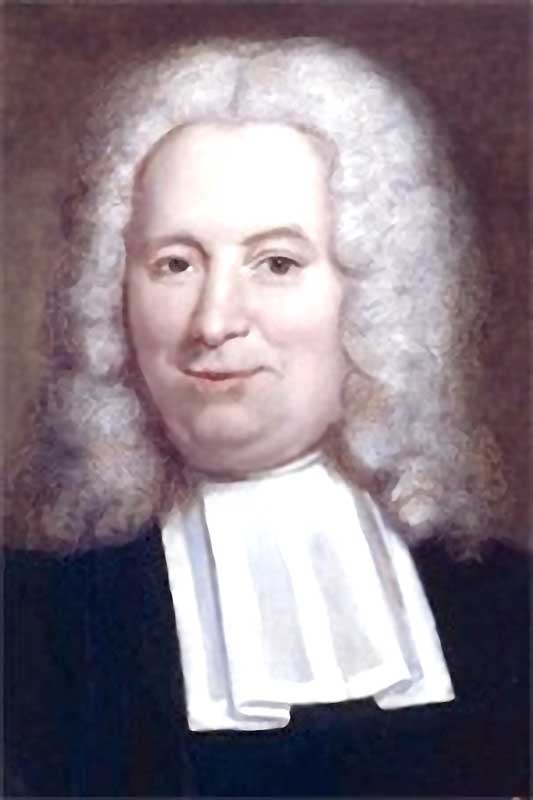
Petrus Wesseling born 7 January

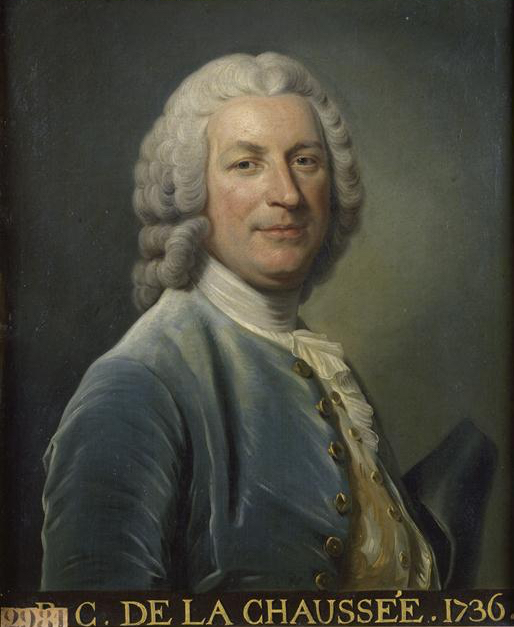
Pierre-Claude Nivelle de La Chaussée born 14 February

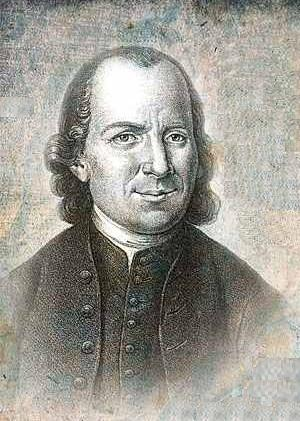
Christian David born 17 February

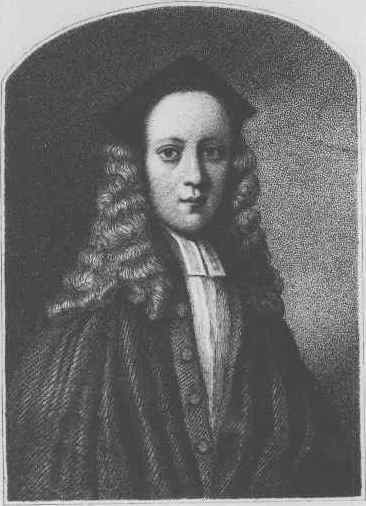
John Byrom born 29 February

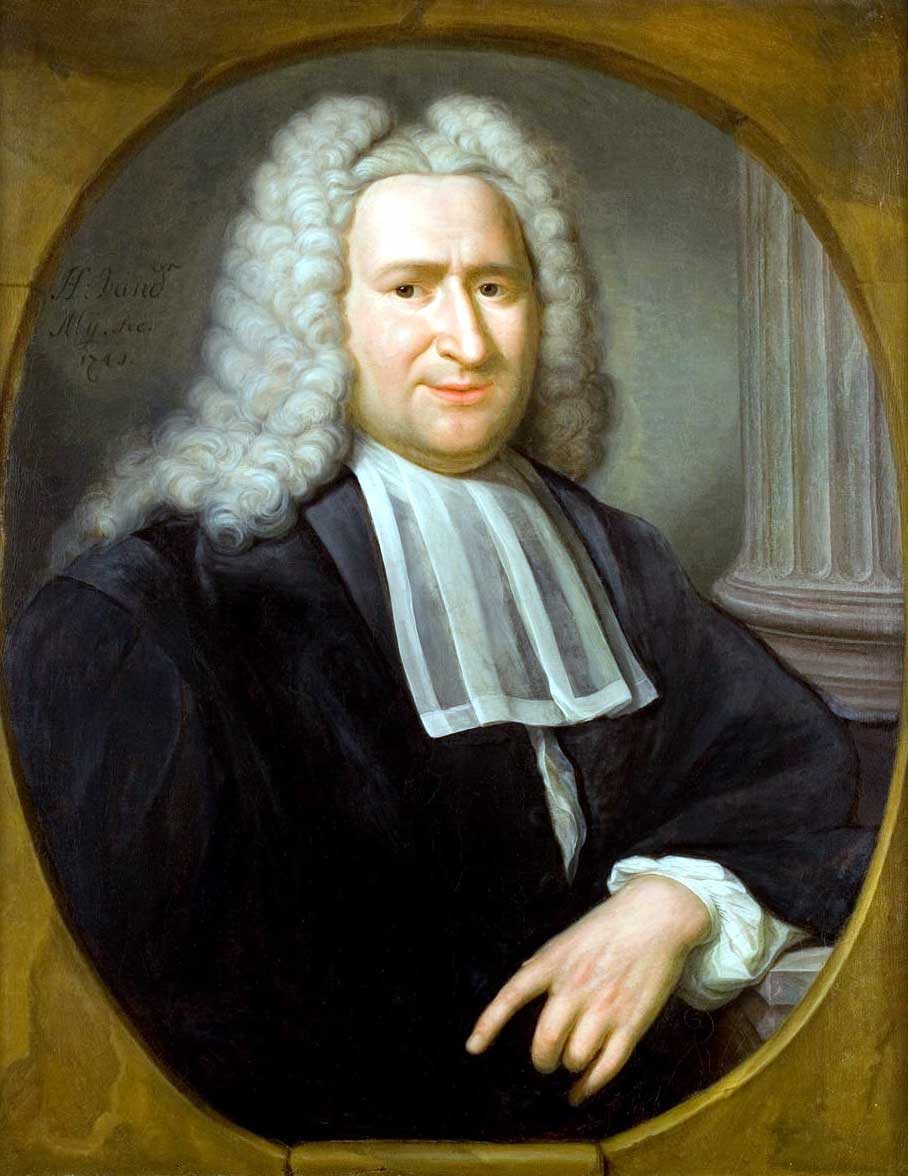
Pieter van Musschenbroek born 14 March

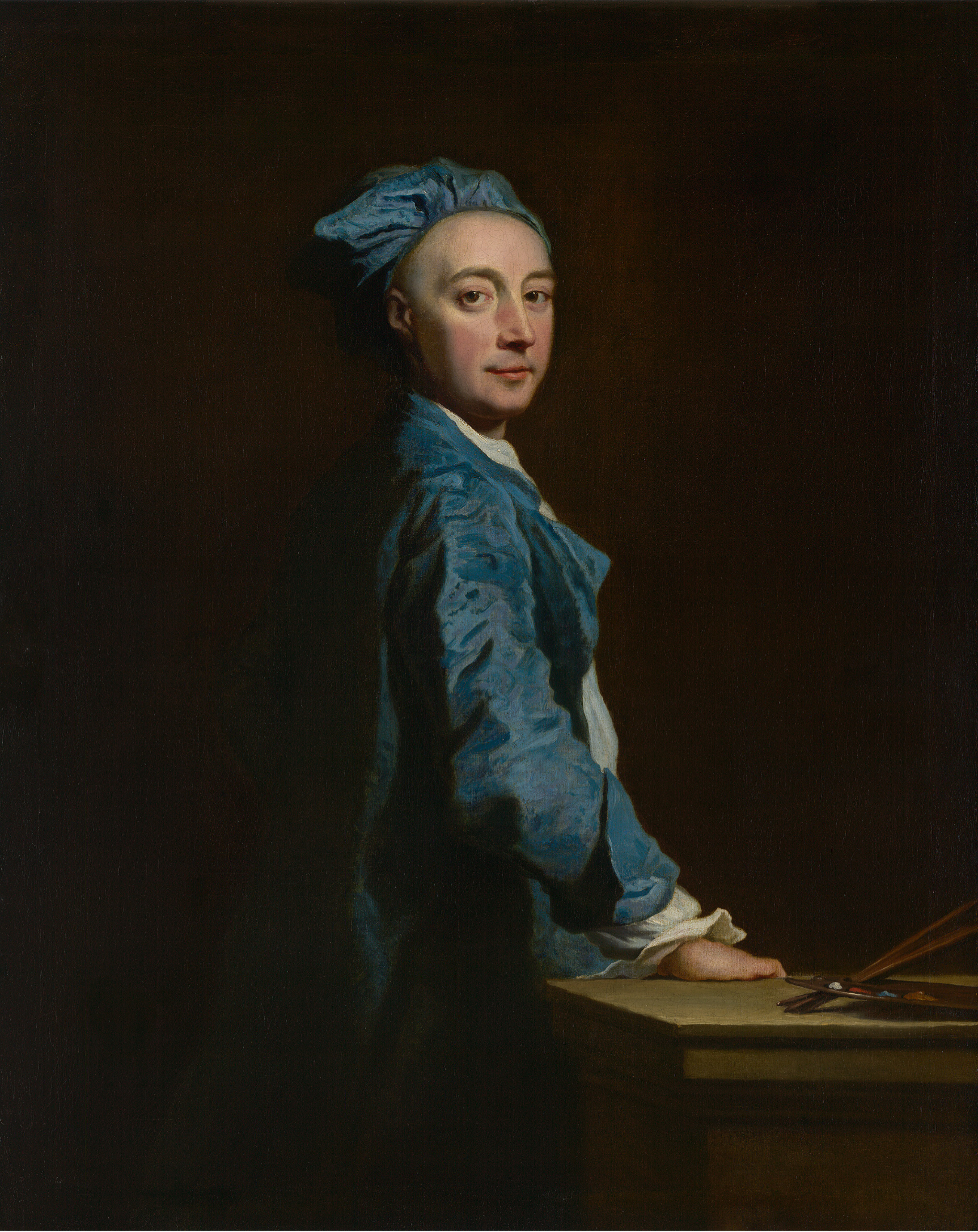
Joseph Highmore born 13 June

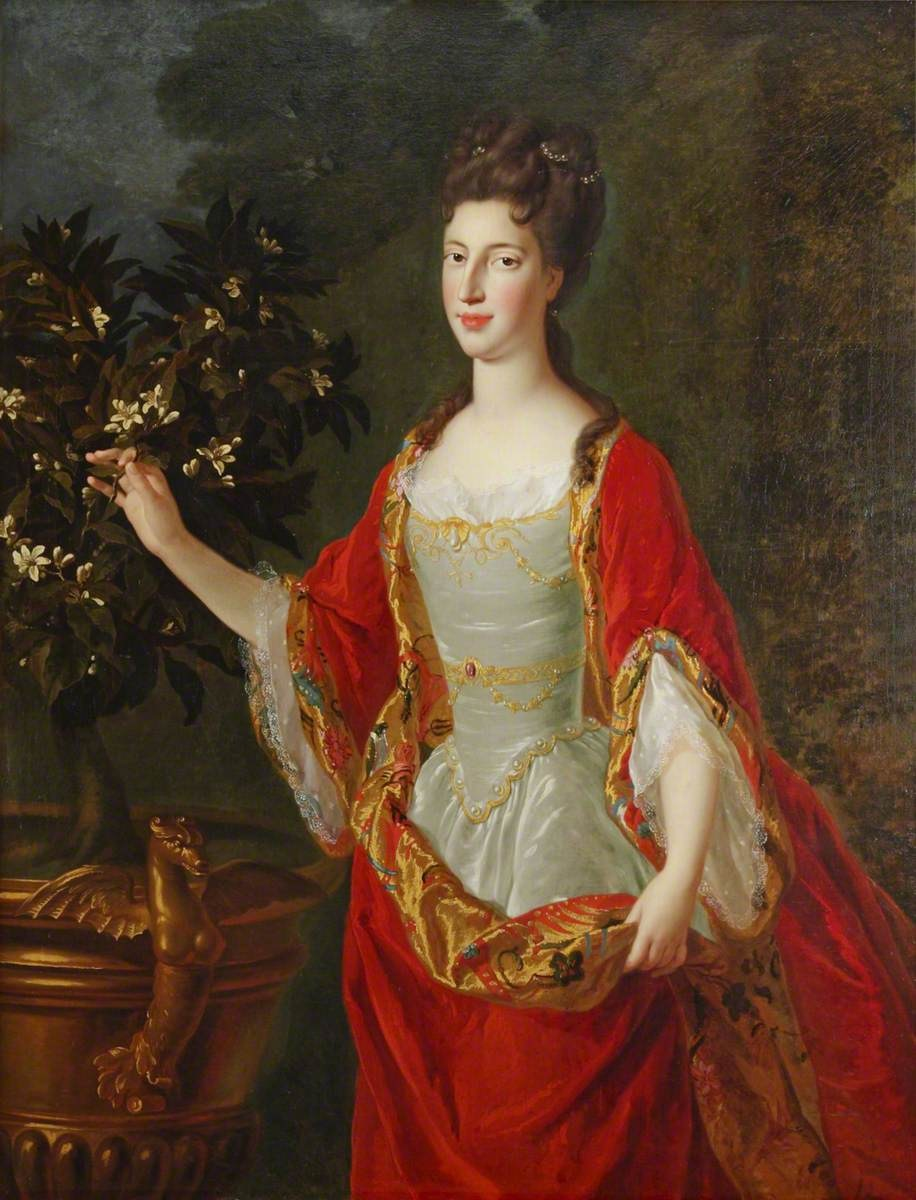
Louisa Maria Stuart born 28 June

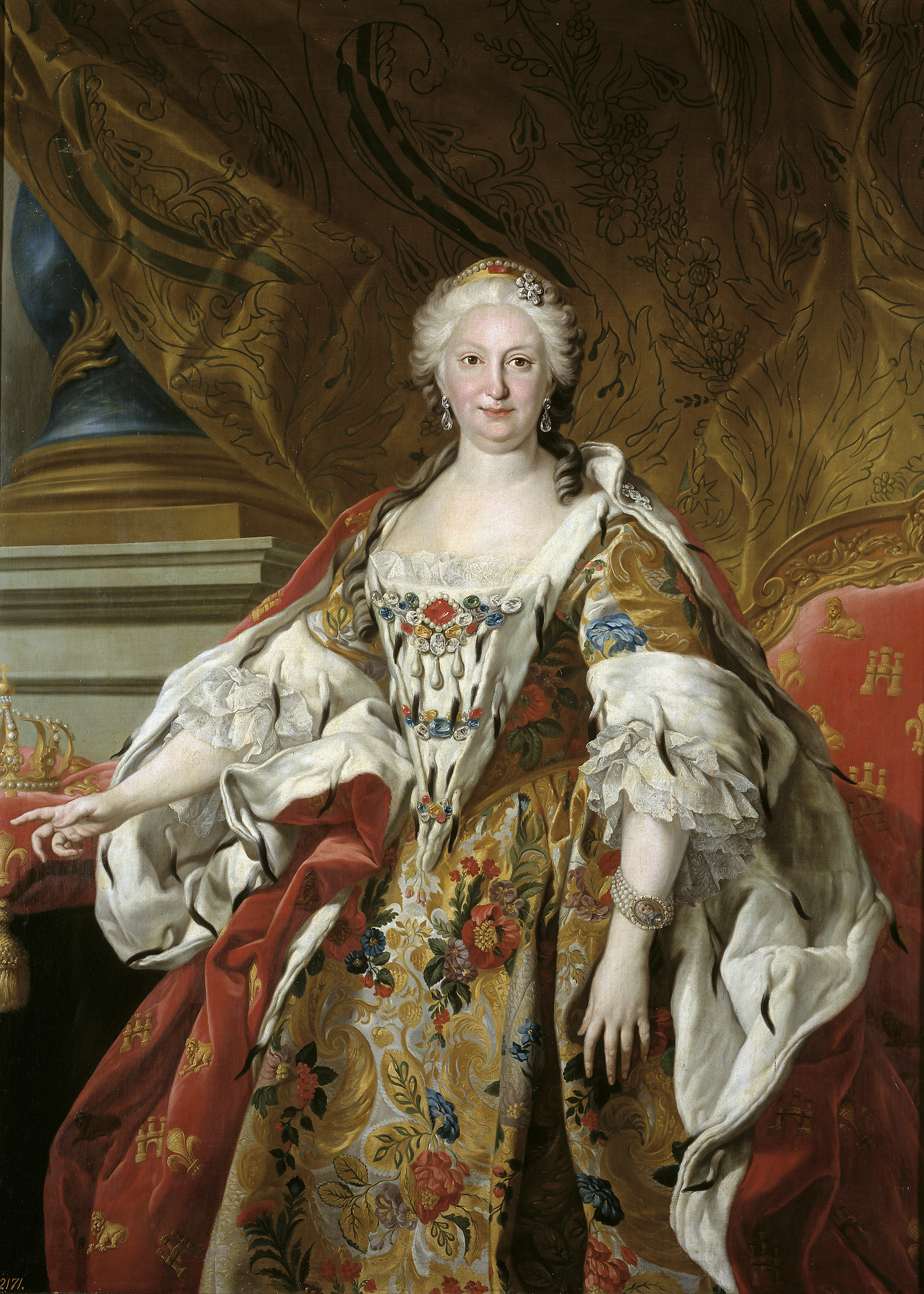
Elisabeth Farnese born 25 October

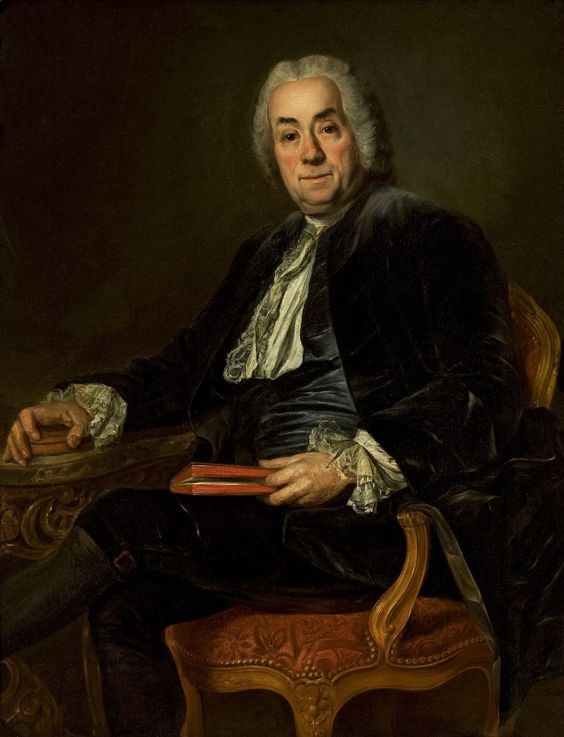
Anne Claude de Caylus born 31 October

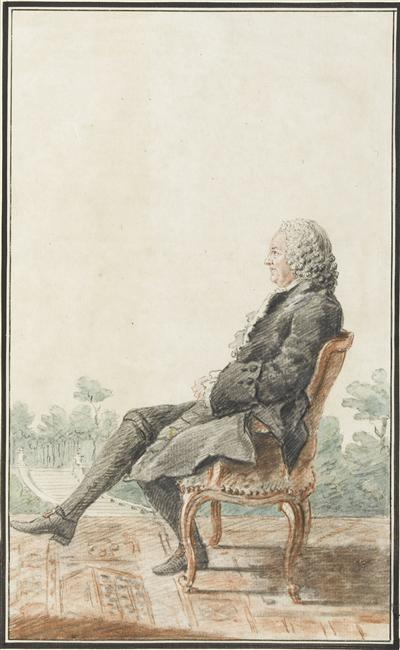
Louis Racine born 6 November

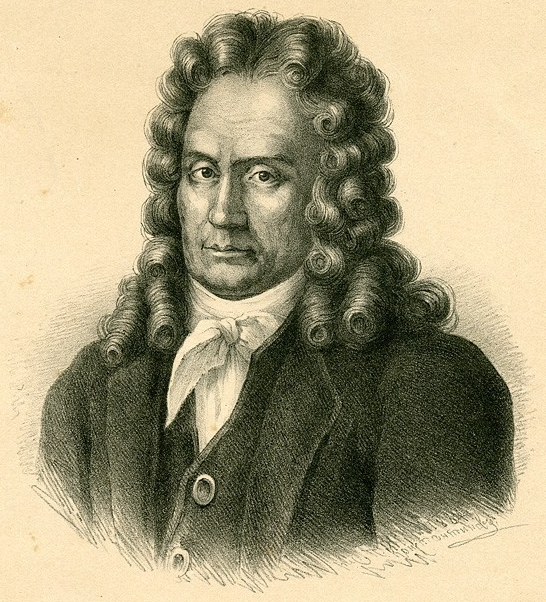
Laurentius Blumentrost born 8 November

=== January–March ===
- January 6 – Francesco Maria Zanotti, Italian philosopher (d. 1777)
- January 7 – Petrus Wesseling, German librarian, law librarian and writer (d. 1764)
- January 12 – Ferdinand Maximilian II of Isenburg-Wächtersbach, count of Isenburg-Wächtersbach (d. 1755)
- January 13 – Gunnila Grubb, Swedish spiritual poet (d. 1729)
- January 24 – Paweł Giżycki, Polish painter and architect (d. 1762)
- January 27 – Ivan Cherkasov, Russian statesman, privy councillor, and cabinet secretary (d. 1758)
- January 30 – William Granville, 3rd Earl of Bath, English peer (d. 1711)
- January 31 – John Conybeare, British bishop (d. 1755)
- February 13 – Louis, Prince of Lambesc, French prince (d. 1743)
- February 14 – Pierre-Claude Nivelle de La Chaussée, French playwright (d. 1754)
- February 16 – Giovanni Domenico Mansi, Roman Catholic archbishop (d. 1769)
- February 17 – Christian David, German religious servant, missionary and carpenter (d. 1751)
- February 18 – Johann Michael Fischer, German architect (d. 1766)
- February 25
  - John Hawkins, Master of Pembroke College, Cambridge (d. 1733)
  - Karl Ludwig von Pöllnitz, German soldier, adventurer and writer (d. 1775)
- February 29 – John Byrom, poet, inventor of a shorthand system (d. 1763)
- March 5 – Sir John Shelley, 4th Baronet, English politician (d. 1771)
- March 14 – Pieter van Musschenbroek, Dutch naturalist (d. 1761)
- March 25 – Tokugawa Tsugutomo, daimyo (d. 1731)
- March 26 – Jean II Restout, French painter (d. 1768)

=== April–June ===
- April 1 – William, Landgrave of Hesse-Philippsthal-Barchfeld (d. 1761)
- April 4
  - James Carnegie, 5th Earl of Southesk, Scottish earl (d. 1730)
  - André Souste, Royal Notary in Canada (d. 1776)
- April 5
  - Jean Calmette, French jesuit and indologist (d. 1740)
  - Adrienne Lecouvreur, French actress (d. 1730)
- April 7 – Pietro Marchesini, Italian painter (d. 1757)
- April 8 – Giuseppe Tartini, Italian composer and violinist (d. 1770)
- April 22 – James Stirling, Scottish mathematician (d. 1770)
- April 29 – Jean Armand de Lestocq, French adventurer (d. 1767)
- May 3 – Jan Jacob Mauricius, Dutch diplomat (d. 1768)
- May 9 – Giuseppe Agostino Orsi, Catholic cardinal (d. 1761)
- May 10 – John Brailsford the elder, English poet (d. 1739)
- May 11 – Sir Thomas Sebright, 4th Baronet, English politician, 1692–1736 (d. 1736)
- May 16 – Dolly Pentreath, last known native speaker of the Cornish language prior to its revival in 1904 (d. 1777)
- May 17 – Edward Lisle, British Member of Parliament (d. 1753)
- May 18 – (O.S) Joseph Butler, English bishop and philosopher (d. 1752)
- May 25 – Archibald Douglas, 2nd Earl of Forfar, Scottish earl (d. 1715)
- May 28
  - Geminiano Giacomelli, Italian composer (d. 1740)
  - Karl von Haimhausen, German missionary (d. 1767)
- June 13 – Joseph Highmore, British artist (d. 1780)
- June 15
  - Giovanni Domenico Ferretti, Italian painter (d. 1768)
  - Ōkubo Tadamasa, daimyo (d. 1732)
- June 28 – Louisa Maria Stuart, British princess (d. 1712)
- June 29 – Jean-François Du Bellay du Resnel, French Roman Catholic priest (d. 1761)

=== July–September ===
- July 1 – Antonio Sandini, Italian ecclesiastical historian (d. 1751)
- July 7 – Edward Montagu, Viscount Hinchingbrooke, British politician and noble (d. 1722)
- July 16 – Antoine Thiout, clockmaker (d. 1767)
- July 19 – Frederick William, Duke of Courland (d. 1711)
- July 24 – Sir James Dalrymple, 2nd Baronet, British politician (d. 1751)
- August 3 – John Henley, English clergyman (d. 1756)
- August 6 – Peter Burrell, politician (d. 1756)
- August 8 – Juan Manuel de la Puente, Spanish composer (d. 1753)
- August 14 – Frederick Anton, Prince of Schwarzburg-Rudolstadt (d. 1744)
- August 18
  - Jacob Folkema, Dutch engraver (d. 1767)
  - Louis Henri, Duke of Bourbon, French politician and prince (d. 1740)
- August 27 – Jacob Christiaan Pielat, Dutch colonial governor (d. 1740)
- August 29 – Nicolas Grozelier, French writer (d. 1778)
- September 1 – Egid Quirin Asam, German sculptor (d. 1750)
- September 11 – Ingela Gathenhielm, Swedish privateer (d. 1729)
- September 12 – Christine Eleonore of Stolberg-Gedern (d. 1745)
- September 15 – Anselm Franz von Ritter zu Groenesteyn, German architect (d. 1765)
- September 16 – Johanna Elisabeth Döbricht, German soprano (d. 1786)
- September 25 – Franz Albert Schultz, German academic (d. 1763)
- September 26
  - Ernst von Steinberg, Hanoverian minister and head of the German Chancery in London (d. 1759)
  - Pietro Antonio Trezzini, Russian architect (d. 1760)
- September 27 – Georg Heinrich Zincke, German academic (d. 1769)

=== October–December ===
- October 3 – Pierre Grimod du Fort, French art collector (d. 1748)
- October 4 – Francis Willoughby, 2nd Baron Middleton, British politician (d. 1758)
- October 6 – Johann Heinrich Pott, German chemist (d. 1777)
- October 8 – Antonio Palella, Italian composer (d. 1761)
- October 15 – Alessandro Albani, collector of antiquities, Roman Catholic cardinal (d. 1779)
- October 18 – Magnus Beronius, Swedish archbishop (d. 1775)
- October 19 – Jehu Curtis, American judge (d. 1753)
- October 24 – Albert Brahms, German pioneer hydraulic engineer (d. 1758)
- October 25 – Elisabeth Farnese, queen of Philip V of Spain (d. 1766)
- October 28 – Joseph Ferdinand of Bavaria, Electoral Prince of Bavaria (d. 1699)
- October 30 – Unico Wilhelm van Wassenaer, Dutch noble, diplomat and composer (d. 1766)
- October 31 – Anne Claude de Caylus, French antiquarian (d. 1765)
- November 6 – Louis Racine, French poet of the Age of the Enlightenment (d. 1763)
- November 7
  - Johann Gottfried Schnabel, German writer (d. 1750)
  - Giuseppe Ginanni, Italian scientist (d. 1753)
- November 8 – Laurentius Blumentrost, Russian court physician and founder and first president of St. Petersburg Academy of Sciences (d. 1755)
- November 11
  - Muhammad Hashim Thattvi, Islamic scholar, author, philanthropist, and spiritual leader (d. 1761)
  - Louis Guy Henri de Valori, French diplomat (d. 1774)
- November 15 – Eusebius Amort, German Roman Catholic theologian (d. 1775)
- November 17 – John Betts Jr., Connecticut politician (d. 1767)
- November 21 – Carlo Innocenzo Frugoni, Italian poet (d. 1768)
- November 28
  - Willoughby Bertie, 3rd Earl of Abingdon (d. 1760)
  - Esprit Pezenas, French astronomer (d. 1776)
- November 30 – Livio Retti, Italian artist (d. 1751)
- December 1 – Isaac Kimber, English journalist and minister (d. 1755)
- December 4 – Ferdinand Leopold, Count of Hohenzollern-Sigmaringen, German nobleman; ruling Count of Hohenzollern-Haigerloch (d. 1750)
- (baptised) December 27 – Francis Blake Delaval, British Royal Navy officer and Member of Parliament (d. 1752)
- December 28 – Robert Shirley, Viscount Tamworth, English politician (d. 1714)
- December 29
  - Thomas Angell, Norwegian merchant/estate/mine owner/philanthropist (d. 1767)
  - Franz Georg Hermann, German painter (d. 1768)
- December 30 – Marie Christine Felizitas of Leiningen-Dagsburg-Falkenburg-Heidesheim (d. 1734)

1693

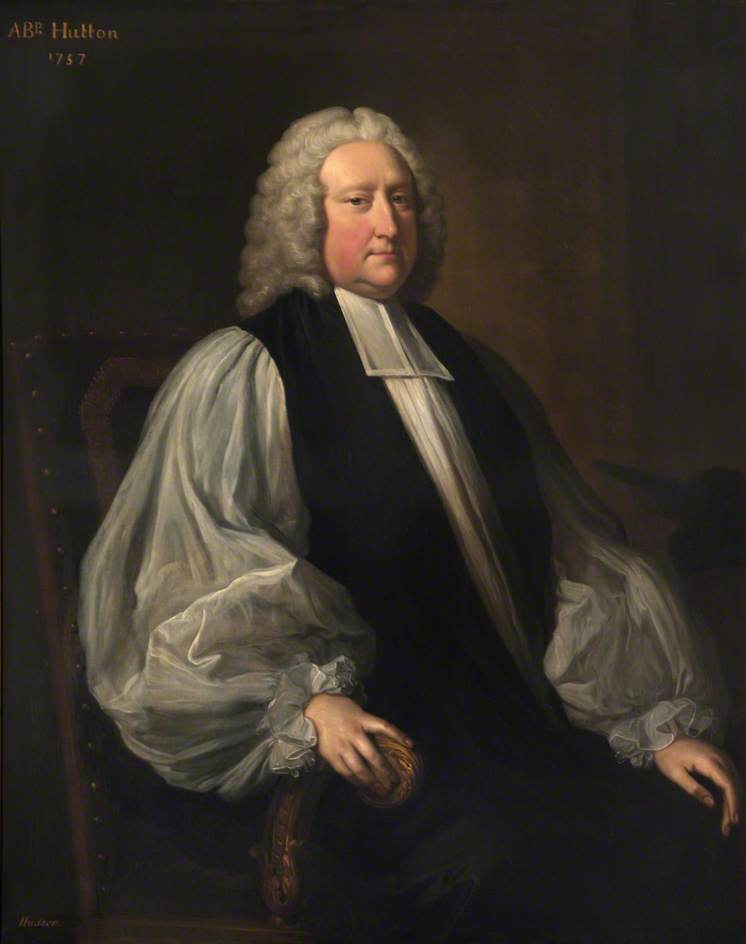
Matthew Hutton (archbishop of Canterbury) born 3 January

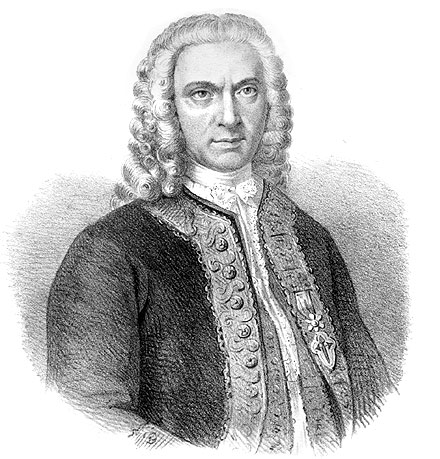
José del Campillo born 13 February

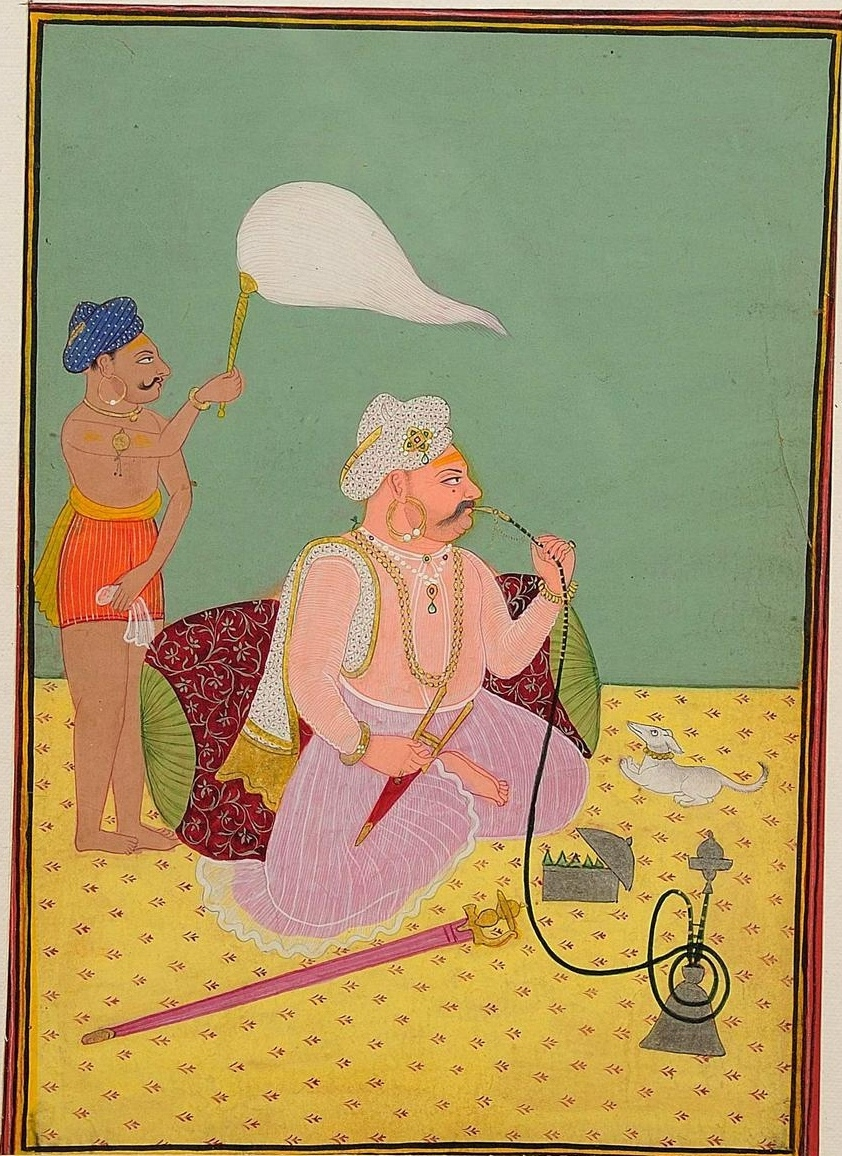
Malhar Rao Holkar born 16 March

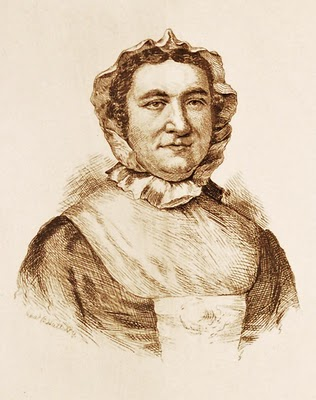
Mary Alexander born 16 April

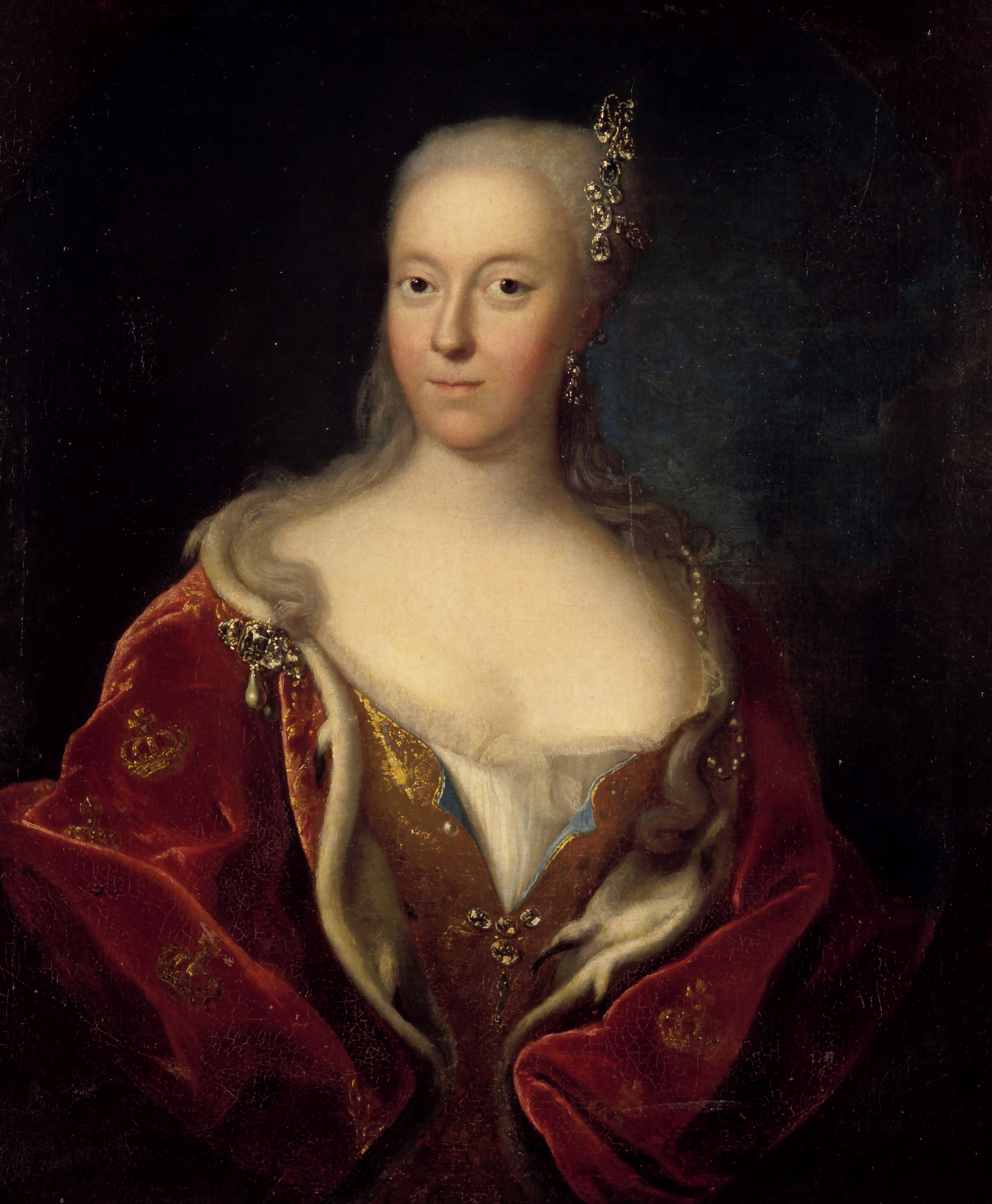
Anne Sophie Reventlow born 16 April

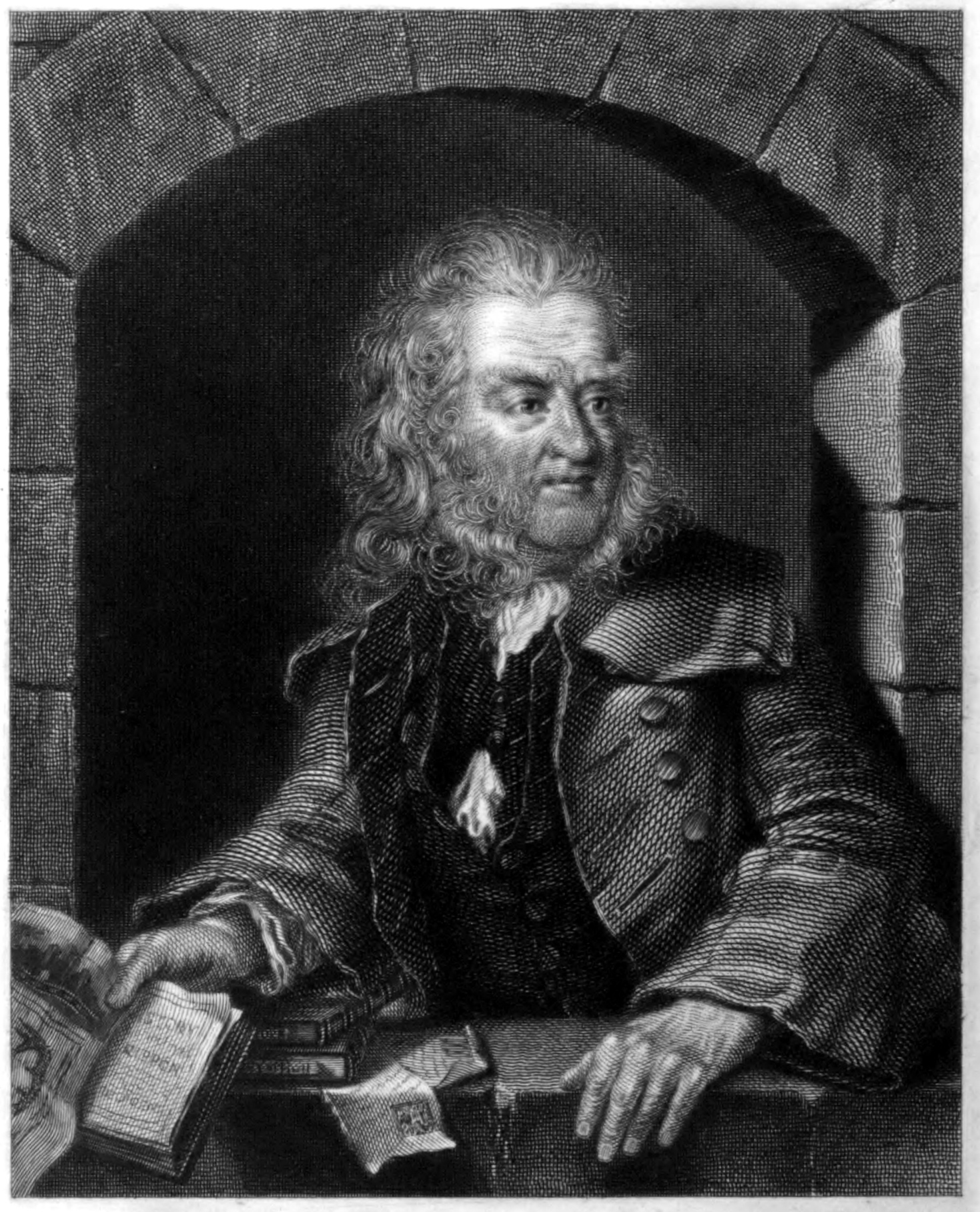
Thomas Gent born 4 May

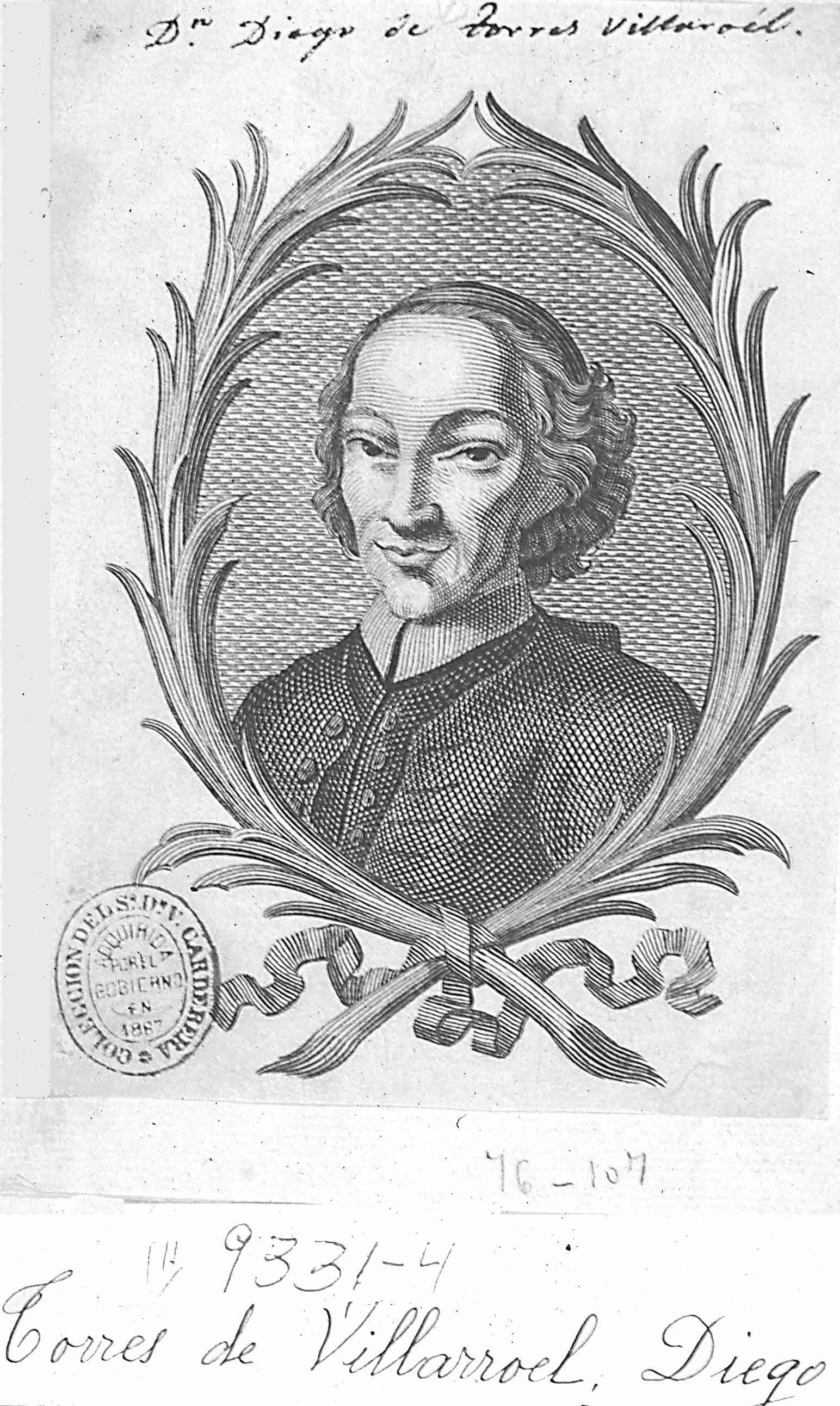
Diego de Torres Villarroel born 17 June

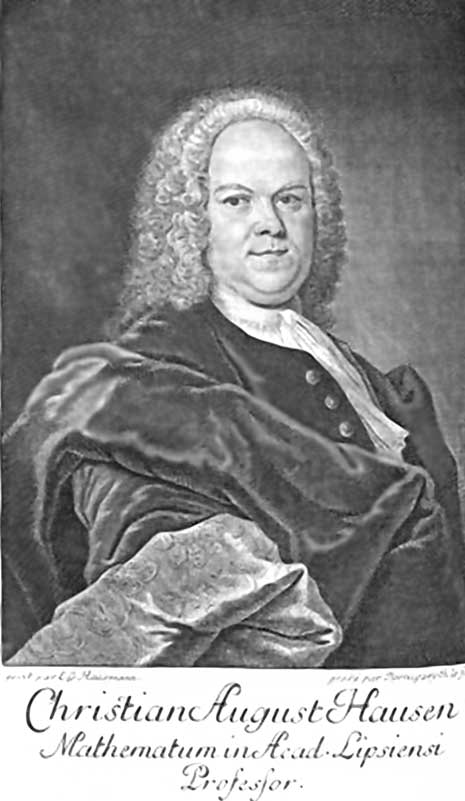
Christian August Hausen born 19 June

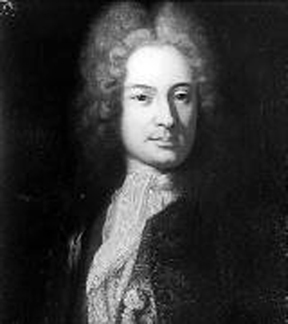
Joseph Emanuel Fischer von Erlach born 13 September

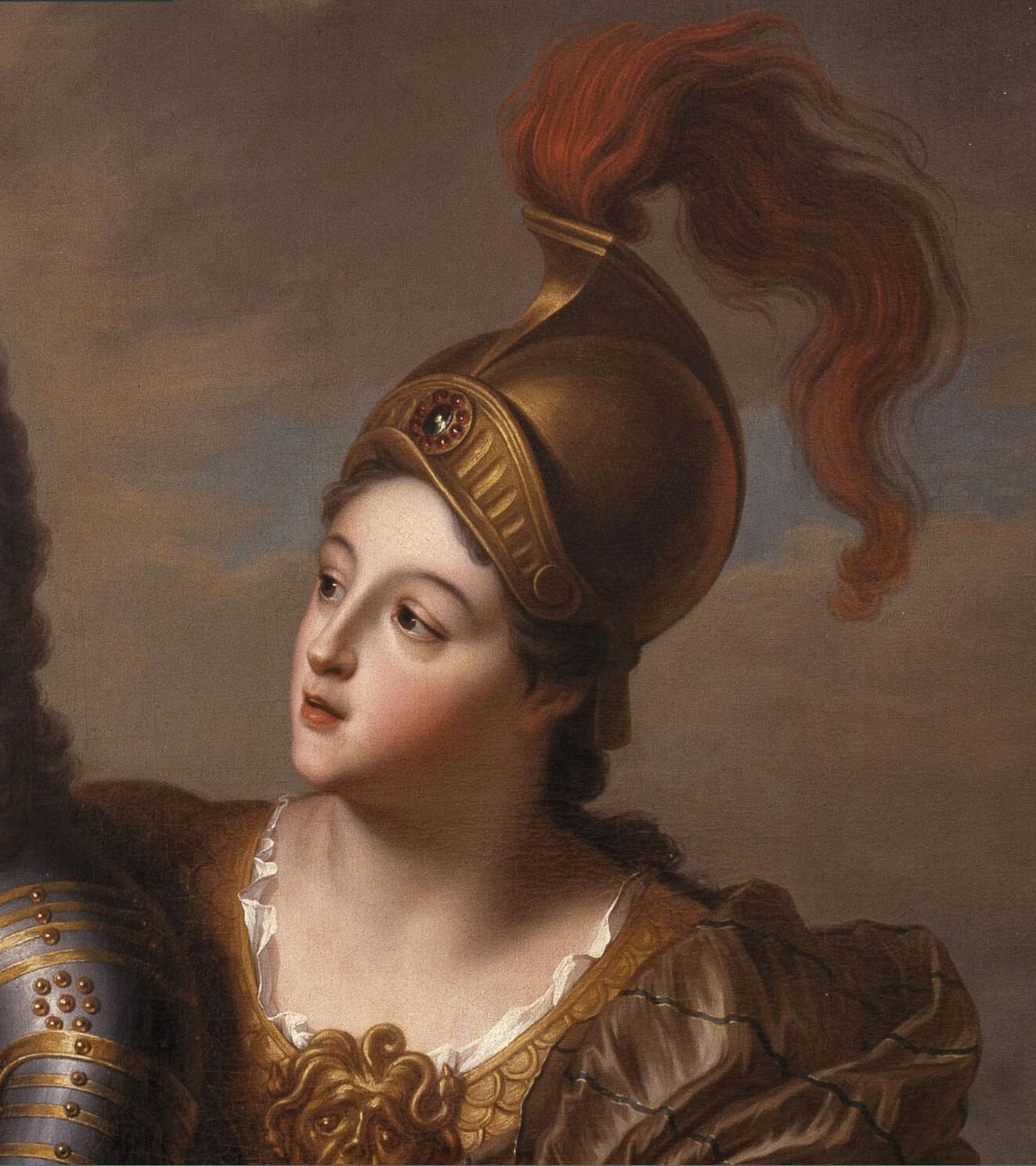
Marie-Madeleine de Parabère born 6 October

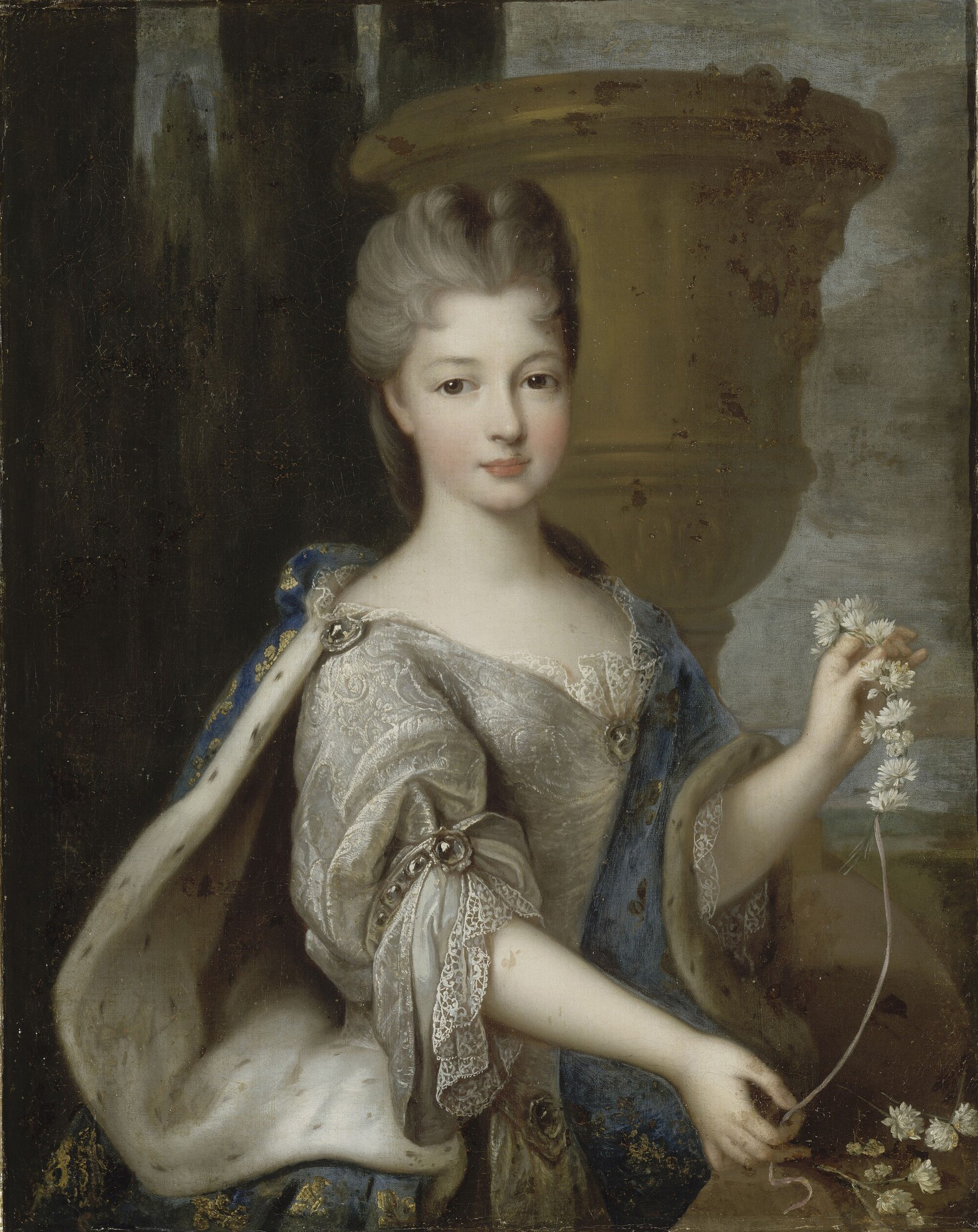
Louise Élisabeth de Bourbon born 22 November

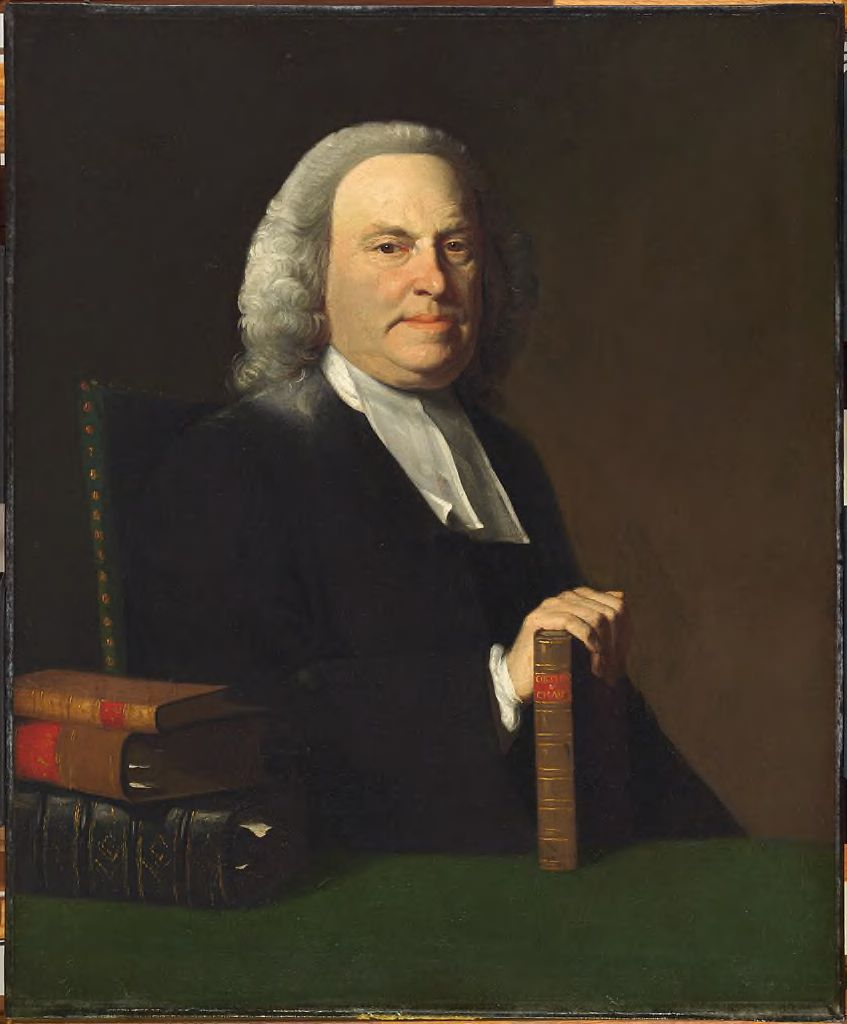
Nathaniel Appleton born 9 December

=== January–March ===
- January 1 – Francesco Carlo Rusca, Swiss painter (d. 1769)
- January 3
  - Giovanni Bianchi, Italian physician and zoologist (d. 1775)
  - Matthew Hutton, Archbishop of York and Archbishop of Canterbury (d. 1758)
- January 12 – Queen Jeongseong, Queen Consort of Korea (d. 1757)
- January 16 – Francesco Campora, Italian painter (d. 1763)
- January 17 – Melchor de Navarrete, Spanish colonial governor of Florida and Mexico (d. 1761)
- January 19
  - Jonathan Rashleigh, politician (d. 1764)
  - Hyacinthe Collin de Vermont, French painter (d. 1761)
- January 23 – Georg Bernhard Bilfinger, German mathematician (d. 1750)
- January 26 – William Robinson, deputy governor of the Colony of Rhode Island and Providence Plantations (d. 1751)
- January 28
  - Robert Sawyer Herbert, British Member of Parliament (d. 1769)
  - Empress Anna of Russia, Empress of Russia (d. 1740)
  - Gregor Werner, Austrian composer (d. 1766)
- January 29 – Henry Herbert, 9th Earl of Pembroke, English peer and architect (d. 1750)
- January 30 – Countess Palatine Maria Anna of Neuburg, Countess Palatine of Neuburg by birth, Duchess of Bavaria (d. 1751)
- February 12 – Avdotya Chernysheva, Russian lady-in-waiting (d. 1747)
- February 13 – José del Campillo, Spanish politician (d. 1743)
- February 15 – Peter Schenk the Younger, German engraver and map publisher (d. 1775)
- February 24
  - James Quin, English actor (d. 1766)
  - Johann Jacob Rambach, German theologian (d. 1735)
- March 2 – Sir Thomas Wheate, 2nd Baronet, English politician (d. 1746)
- March 5 – Johann Jakob Wettstein, Swiss theologian (d. 1754)
- March 6 – Edward Willes, English Anglican bishop and cryptanalyst (d. 1773)
- March 7 – Pope Clement XIII, pope of the Catholic Church (d. 1769)
- March 15 – Sir William Heathcote, 1st Baronet, British politician (d. 1751)
- March 16 – Malhar Rao Holkar, Indian nobleman (d. 1766)
- March 17 – Countess Palatine Elisabeth Auguste Sofie of Neuburg, Grandmother of Maximilian I Joseph of Bavaria (d. 1728)

=== April–June ===
- April 1 – Melusina von der Schulenburg, Countess of Walsingham, British Countess (d. 1778)
- April 3
  - George Edwards, English naturalist (d. 1773)
  - John Harrison, English clockmaker, horologist and inventor of the marine chronometer (d. 1776)
- April 4 – John West, 1st Earl De La Warr, British general (d. 1766)
- April 13 – Johann Georg Keyßler, German polymath (d. 1743)
- April 16
  - Mary Alexander, British American merchant (d. 1760)
  - Anne Sophie Reventlow, Danish royal consort, Queen of Denmark-Norway (d. 1743)
- April 20 – Daniel Brodhead II, American justice of the peace (d. 1755)
- April 25 – Sir Charles Hotham, 5th Baronet, British diplomat (d. 1738)
- April 26 – William Wollaston, British politician (d. 1757)
- April 29 – Asmus Ehrenreich von Bredow (d. 1756)
- April 30 – Giuseppe Maria Feroni, Italian cardinal (d. 1767)
- May 4 – Thomas Gent, Irish printer and writer (d. 1778)
- May 9 – Charles Howard, 7th Earl of Suffolk, English Earl (d. 1722)
- May 10
  - John Fox, English biographer (d. 1763)
  - Henry Hare, 3rd Baron Coleraine, Irish peer and politician (d. 1749)
- May 15 – Henry Winder, English chronologist (d. 1752)
- May 24 – Georg Rafael Donner, Austrian sculptor (d. 1741)
- May 31 – Bartolomeo Nazari, Italian painter (d. 1758)
- June 1
  - Alexey Bestuzhev-Ryumin, Russian diplomat, chancellor of the Russian Empire (d. 1768)
  - Johann Dietrich von Hülsen, German canon (d. 1767)
- June 17
  - Prince Charles William of Hesse-Darmstadt, Prince of Hesse-Darmstadt and Obrist (d. 1707)
  - Diego de Torres Villarroel, Spanish writer (d. 1770)
  - Johann Georg Walch, German theologian (d. 1775)
- June 19 – Christian August Hausen, German mathematician and physicist (d. 1743)
- June 20 – Wilhelmina Maria Frederica of Rochlitz, Polish noble (d. 1729)
- June 29 – Juan Bautista de Anza I, Spanish militar and explorer (d. 1740)

=== July–September ===
- July 7 – Gilles-François de Beauvais, French Jesuit (d. 1773)
- July 12 – Jean-Baptiste de Brancas, Roman Catholic archbishop (d. 1770)
- July 16 – Cecilia Rosa de Jesús Talangpaz, Servant of God (d. 1731)
- July 17 – Gerard Melder, miniature and watercolor painter from the Northern Netherlands (d. 1754)
- July 21 – Thomas Pelham-Holles, 1st Duke of Newcastle, Prime Minister of Great Britain (d. 1768)
- July 26 – Alexandre Le Riche de La Poupelinière, Patron of music and literature (d. 1762)
- August 1 – Hugh Hughes, Welsh poet (d. 1776)
- August 7
  - Sir Edmund Bacon, 5th Baronet, British politician (d. 1738)
  - Charles, Prince of Rochefort, French noble (d. 1763)
- August 8 – Laurent Belissen, French composer (d. 1762)
- August 9
  - Anne Cecil, Countess of Salisbury, British noble (d. 1757)
  - Princess Sophia Wilhelmina of Saxe-Coburg-Saalfeld, Princess of Saxe-Coburg-Saalfeld by birth and by marriage Princess of Schwarzburg-Rudolstadt (d. 1727)
- August 11 – Francisco de Merlo, Spanish noblemen, military and notary (d. 1758)
- August 13 – Gustavus Handcock, Irish politician (d. 1751)
- September 3 – Charles Radclyffe, Titular 5th Earl of Derwentwater (d. 1746)
- September 7 – Victor I, Prince of Anhalt-Bernburg-Schaumburg-Hoym (d. 1772)
- September 9 – Quinault-Dufresne, French actor (d. 1767)
- September 10 – James MacSparran, Church of England clergyman in America (d. 1757)
- September 13 – Joseph Emanuel Fischer von Erlach, Austrian architect (d. 1742)
- September 19 – Louis Charles Armand Fouquet, French general and diplomat (d. 1747)
- September 21 – Thomas Secker, Archbishop of Canterbury (d. 1768)
- September 22 – Simon Nikolaus Euseb von Montjoye-Hirsingen, Prince Bishop of Basel (d. 1775)

=== October–December ===
- October 3 – Conway Blennerhassett, Irish politician (d. 1724)
- October 5 – Johann Christian Buxbaum, German physician, botanist and traveller (d. 1730)
- October 6 – Marie-Madeleine de Parabère, French aristocrat (d. 1755)
- October 9 – Johann Lorenz von Mosheim, German church historian (d. 1755)
- October 11
  - Frederick Charles, Prince of Stolberg-Gedern (d. 1767)
  - John Hobart, 1st Earl of Buckinghamshire, British politician (d. 1756)
- October 14 – Daniel Maichel, German philosopher (d. 1752)
- October 15 – Sir Edward Wilmot, 1st Baronet, Royal surgeon (d. 1786)
- October 18
  - John Chandler, American judge and sheriff (d. 1762)
  - John Gilbert, Archbishop of York (d. 1761)
  - Jeremiah Markland, British classical scholar (d. 1776)
- October 20 – Gideon Wanton, Rhode Island colonial governor (d. 1767)
- October 21
  - Adriaan van der Burg, painter from the Northern Netherlands (d. 1733)
  - Frederik Nannestad, Norwegian bishop (d. 1774)
- October 22 – Thomas Fairfax, 6th Lord Fairfax of Cameron, American planter (d. 1781)
- October 25 – Antoine Ferrein, French anatomist (d. 1769)
- October 28 – Šimon Brixi, Czech composer (d. 1735)
- October 30 – Samuel Chew, American judge (d. 1743)
- November 5 – Ivan Neplyuyev, Russian noble (d. 1773)
- November 9 – Countess Henriette Charlotte of Nassau-Idstein, German princess (d. 1734)
- November 10 – Roland-Michel Barrin de La Galissonière, French admiral (d. 1756)
- November 13 – Thomas Watson-Wentworth, 1st Marquess of Rockingham, British politician (d. 1750)
- November 22
  - Louise Élisabeth de Bourbon, daughter of Louis (d. 1775)
  - Zheng Xie, Chinese painter (d. 1766)
- November 28 – Anthonie van der Heim, Dutch politician, urban magistrate and judge in Rotterdam, Grand Pensionary of Holland (d. 1746)
- November 30 – Christoph Förster, German composer (d. 1745)
- December 9 – Nathaniel Appleton, Congregational minister (d. 1784)
- December 29 – Pierre Joseph Céloron de Blainville, French explorer (d. 1759)
- date unknown – Heyat Mahmud, Bengali poet (d. 1760)

1694

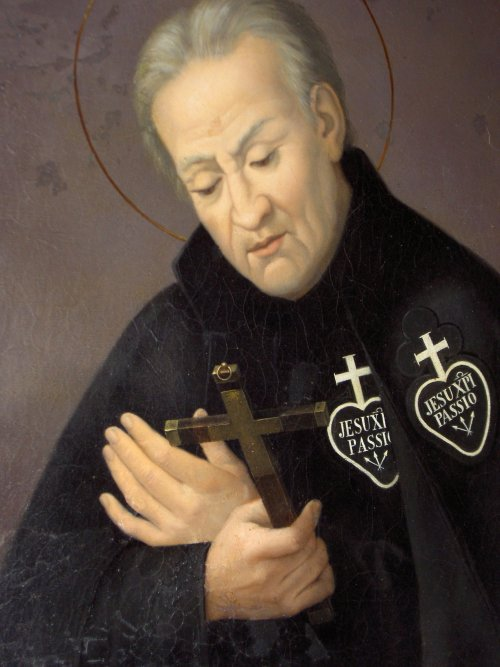
Paul of the Cross born 3 January

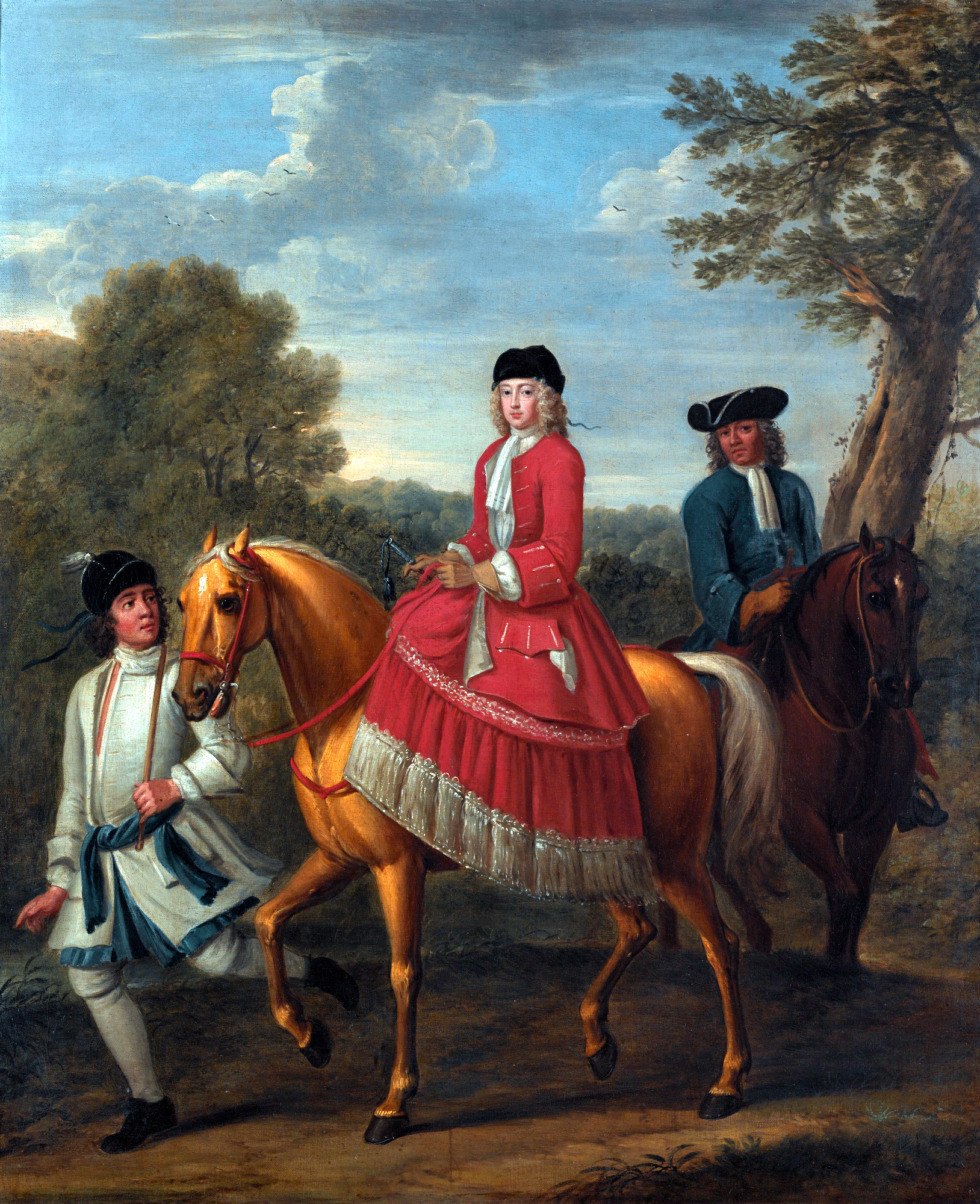
Henrietta Harley, Countess of Oxford and Countess Mortimer born 11 February

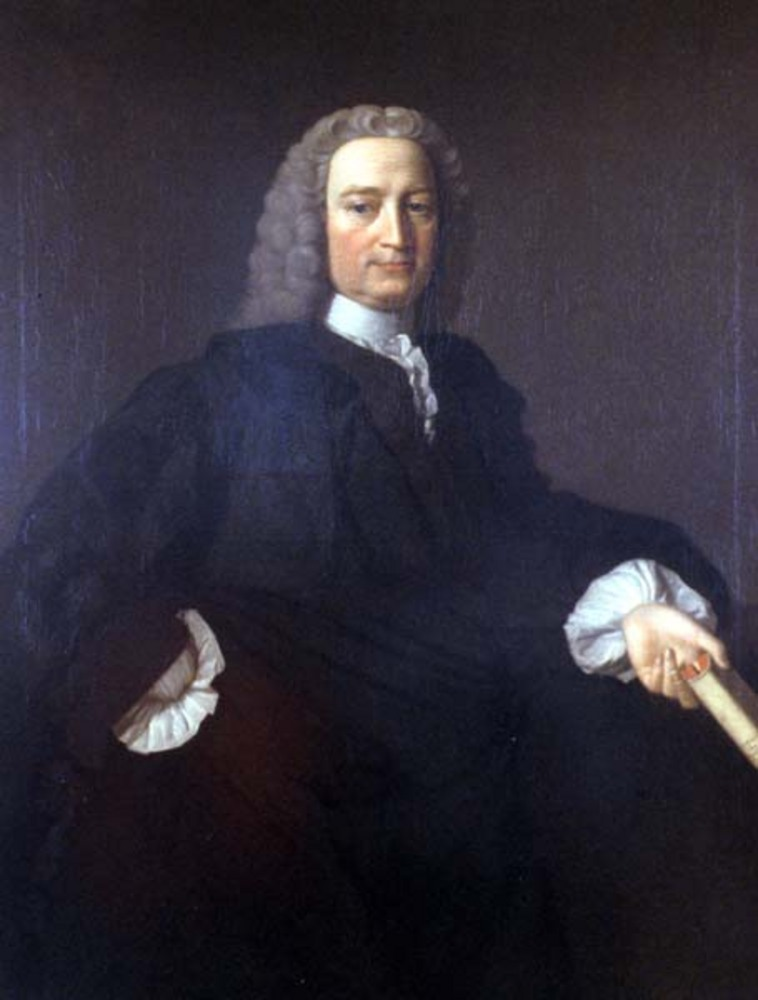
Francis Hutcheson (philosopher) born 8 August

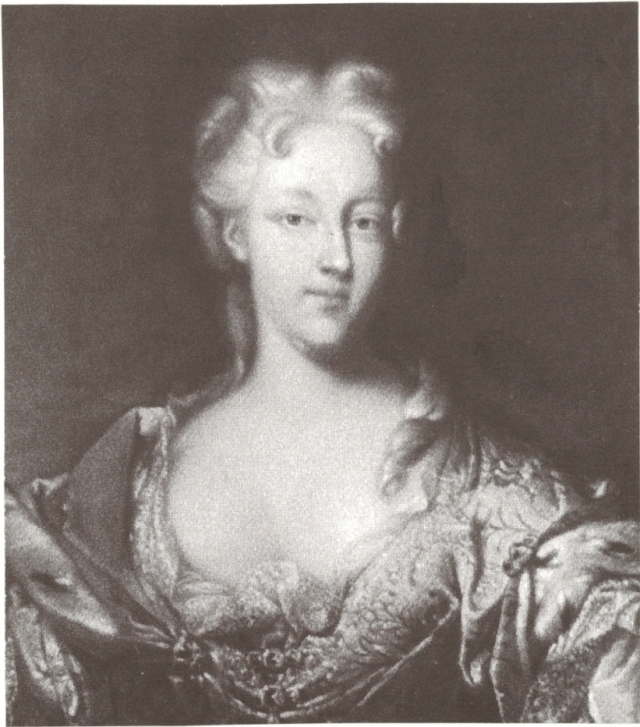
Christiane Charlotte of Württemberg-Winnental born 20 August

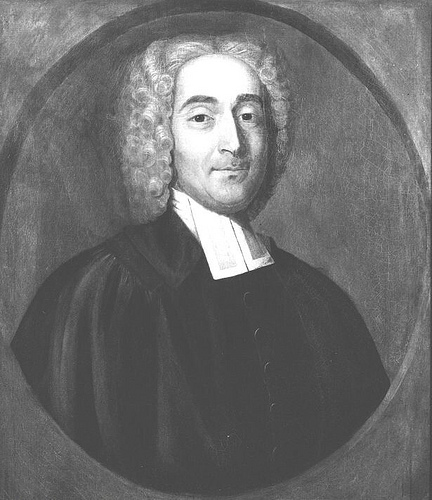
Elisha Williams born 26 August

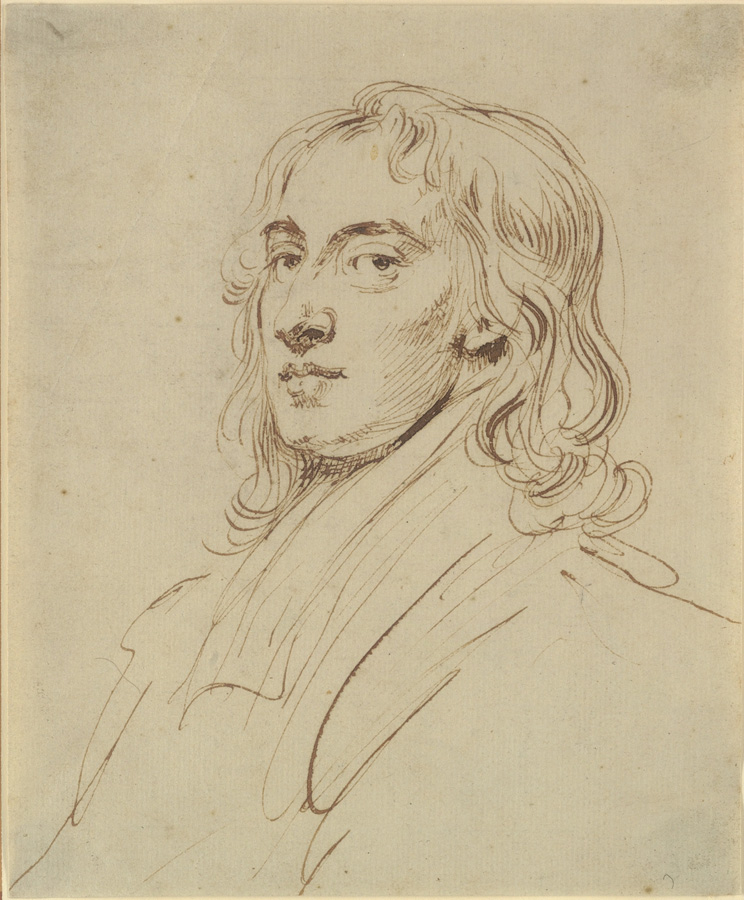
John Vanderbank born 9 September

Yeongjo of Joseon born 13 September

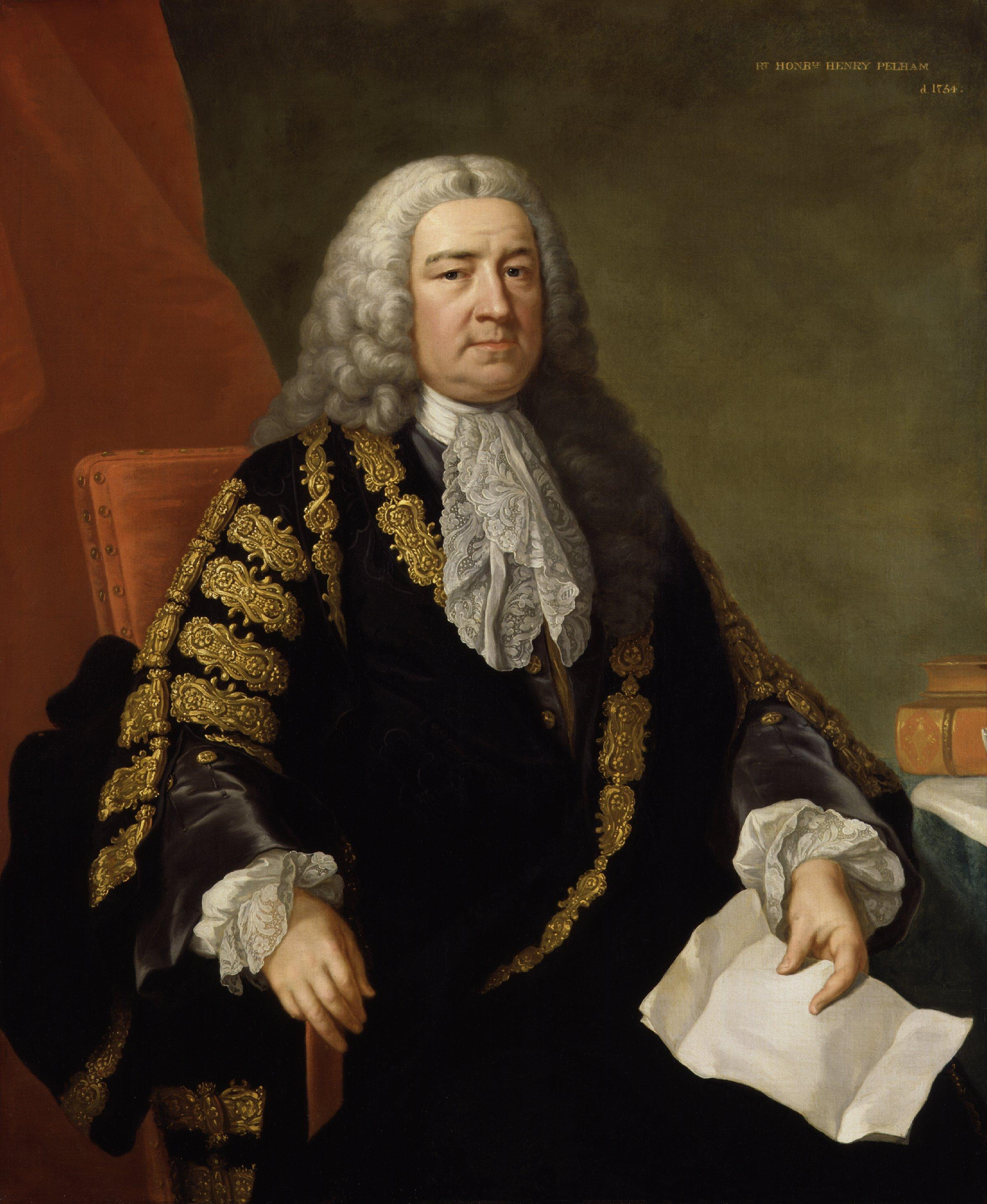
Henry Pelham born 25 September

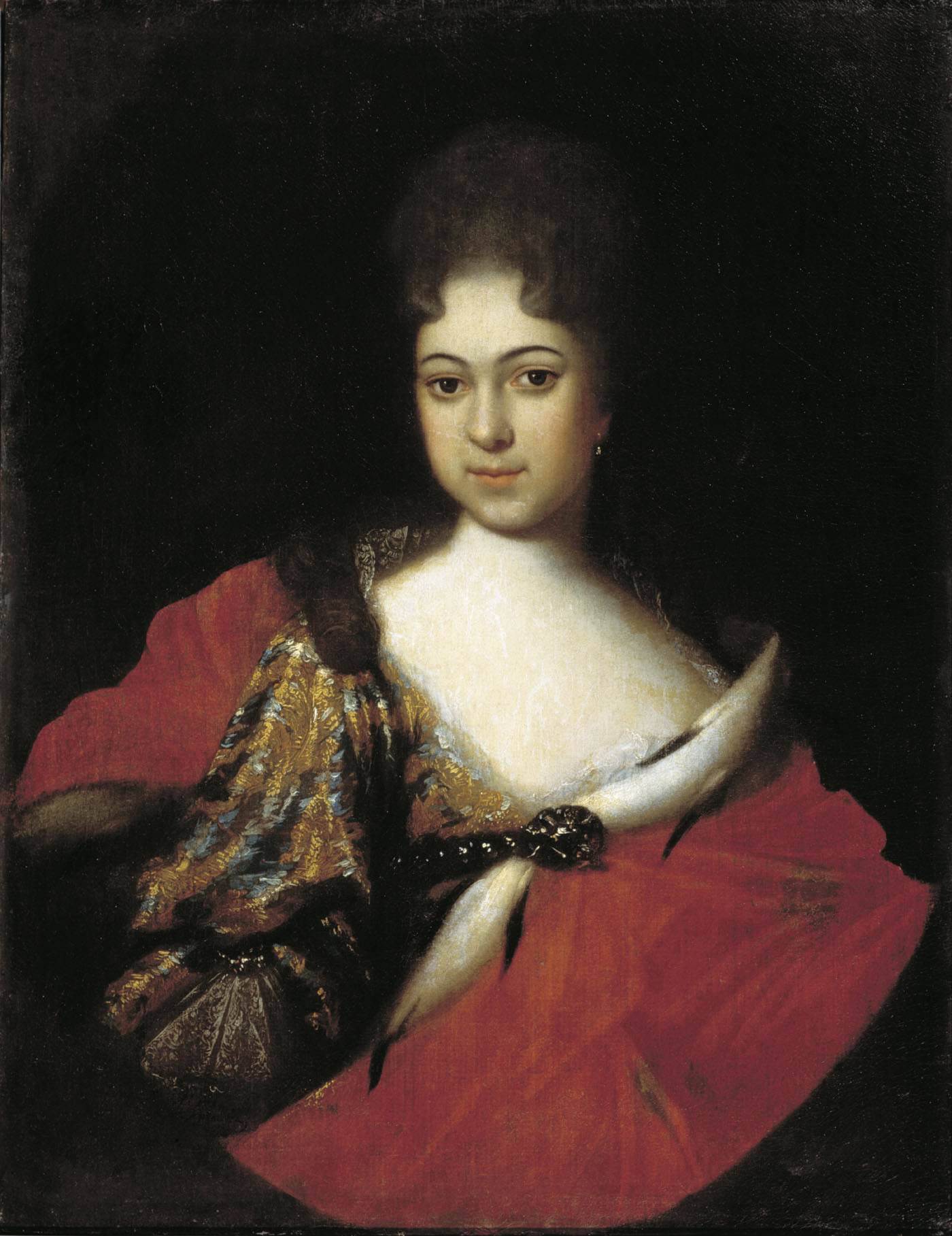
Tsarevna Praskovya Ivanovna of Russia born 4 October

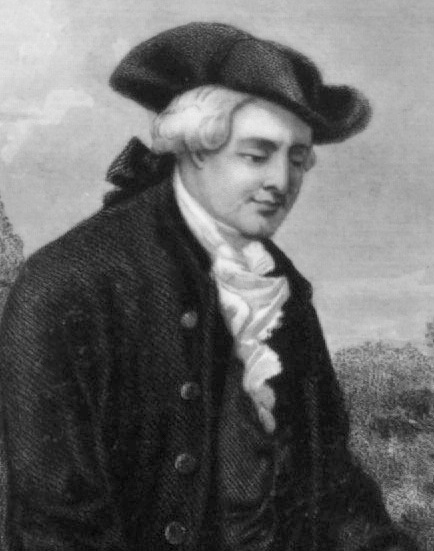
Augustine Washington born 12 November

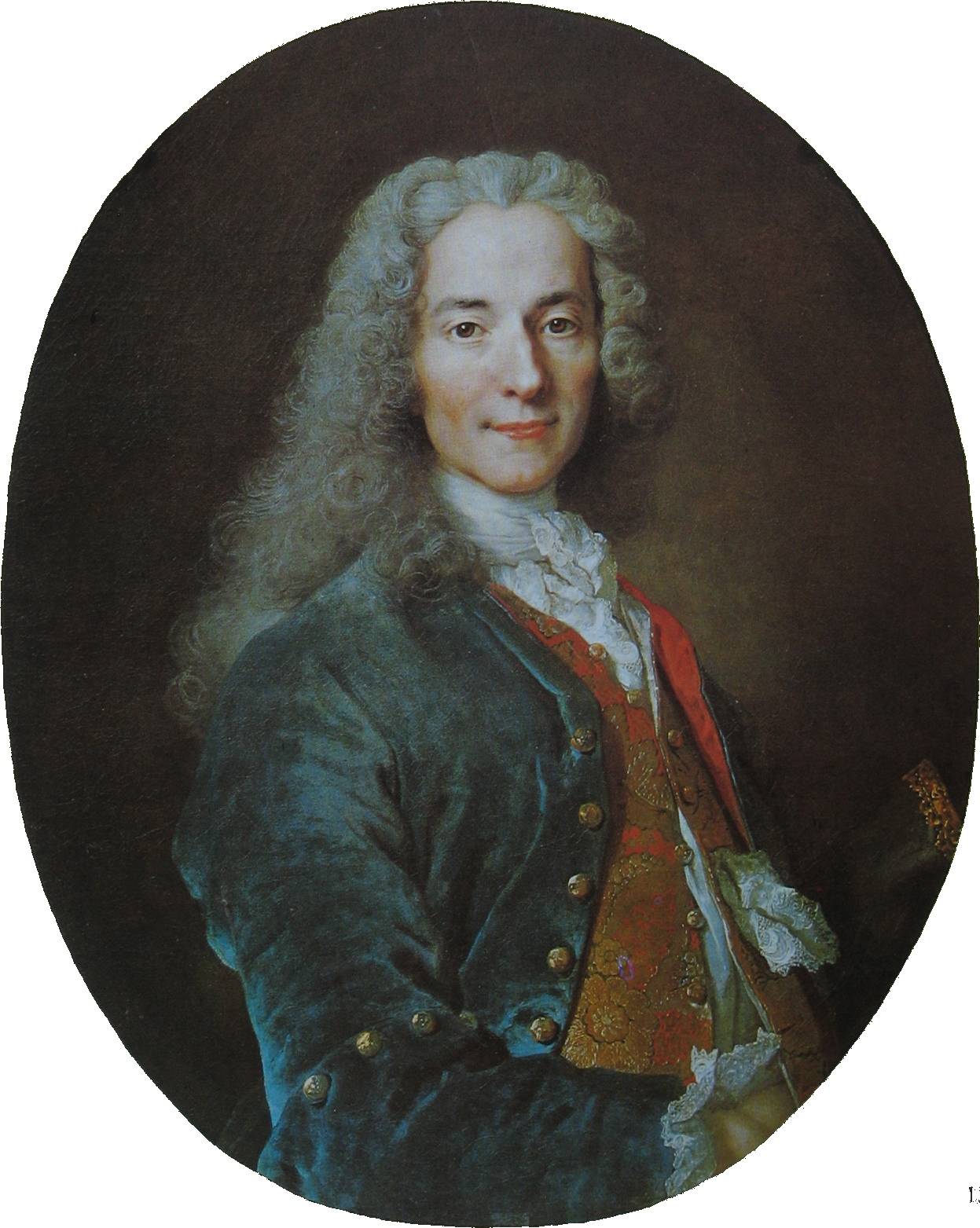
Voltaire born 21 November

=== January–March ===
- January 1 – Abdallah of Morocco, Sultan of Morocco (d. 1757)
- January 3 – Paul of the Cross, Italian mystic (d. 1775)
- January 5 – Theophilus Siegfried Bayer, German sinologist (d. 1738)
- January 6 – Melchor Chyliński, Polish presbyter (d. 1741)
- January 12
  - Oluf Blach, Danish merchant (d. 1767)
  - Johann Heinrich Callenberg, German theologian (d. 1760)
- January 25 – Simon Henry Adolph, Count of Lippe-Detmold (d. 1734)
- January 28 – Peter Collinson, botanist (d. 1768)
- February 1 – Giuseppe Spinelli, Catholic cardinal (d. 1763)
- February 4 – Georg Gottlob Richter, German philosopher and physician (d. 1773)
- February 11 – Henrietta Harley, Countess of Oxford and Countess Mortimer, English noblewoman (d. 1755)
- February 18 – Johann Christoph Handke, Czech painter (d. 1774)
- February 21 – Richard Waldron, Colonial New Hampshire businessman and politician (d. 1753)
- February 24 – Bartolomeo Altomonte, Austrian artist (d. 1783)
- March 11 – Elizabeth Tollet, British poet (d. 1754)
- March 15 – Friedrich Michael Ziegenhagen, English clergyman with German connection (d. 1776)
- March 21 – Daniel Scott, British lexicographer (d. 1759)
- March 24
  - Giuseppe Bernardi, Italian sculptor (d. 1774)
  - Thomas Bullock, Anglican dean (d. 1760)
- March 25 – Christian Otto of Limburg, Reigning count of Limburg-Styrum-Styrum (d. 1749)

=== April–June ===
- April 3 – George Edwards, English naturalist and ornithologist (d. 1773)
- April 14 – Maximilien-Henri de Horion (d. 1759)
- April 25 – Richard Boyle, 3rd Earl of Burlington, English architect (d. 1753)
- April 30 – William Pitkin, Governor of the Connecticut Colony (d. 1769)
- May 7 – Pierre-Jean Mariette, French art historian (d. 1774)
- May 8 – Étienne Lauréault de Foncemagne, French writer (d. 1779)
- May 10 – Michael Harvey, British Member of Parliament (d. 1748)
- May 11
  - Princess Maria Theresia of Liechtenstein, Czech noblewoman (d. 1772)
  - Hieronymus Florentinus Quehl, German composer (d. 1739)
- May 22 – Daniel Gran, Austrian painter (d. 1757)
- June 3 – Scawen Kenrick, English clergyman (d. 1753)
- June 4 – François Quesnay, French economist (d. 1774)
- June 6 – Francis Wollaston, English scientist (d. 1774)
- June 9 – Price Devereux, 10th Viscount Hereford, British politician (d. 1748)
- June 11 – Thomas Willoughby, British politician (d. 1742)
- June 18 – Karl Heinrich von Hoym, German diplomat, statesman and politician (d. 1736)
- June 19 – Jean-André Peyssonnel, French physician (d. 1759)
- June 20 – Hans Adolph Brorson, Danish bishop (d. 1764)
- June 23 – Stamp Brooksbank, MP and Governor of the Bank of England (d. 1756)
- June 24 – Jean-Jacques Burlamaqui, Genevan legal and political theorist (d. 1748)
- June 26 – Georg Brandt, Swedish chemist and mineralogist (d. 1768)
- June 27 – John Michael Rysbrack, Flemish sculptor (d. 1770)
- June 29 – Maria Josepha of Dietrichstein, German noblewoman, member of the House of Dietrichstein; by marriage Countess and later Princess Kinsky of Wchinitz und Tettau (d. 1758)

=== July–September ===
- July 4
  - Claudio Francesco Beaumont, Italian painter (d. 1766)
  - Louis-Claude Daquin, French composer (d. 1772)
- July 11 – Charles-Antoine Coypel, French painter, art commentator, and playwright (d. 1752)
- July 12 – Duchess Gustave Caroline of Mecklenburg-Strelitz, German noble (d. 1748)
- July 16 – Marcus Beresford, 1st Earl of Tyrone, Irish politician (d. 1763)
- July 18
  - Alexander Buturlin, Russian general and courtier (d. 1767)
  - Margarete von Leiningen-Westerburg-Neuleiningen (d. 1761)
- August 1 – Michael Davies, priest (d. 1779)
- August 3 – Marc-Antoine-Nicolas de Croismare, French dilettante (d. 1772)
- August 4 – Étienne-François Avisse, French playwright (d. 1747)
- August 5 – Leonardo Leo, Italian composer (d. 1744)
- August 8 – Francis Hutcheson, Scottish philosopher (d. 1746)
- August 10 – John Leveson-Gower, 1st Earl Gower, British politician (d. 1754)
- August 11 – Giorgio Baffo, Venetian senator and poet (d. 1768)
- August 14
  - James Hamilton, 1st Earl of Clanbrassil, Member of the Parliament of Great Britain (d. 1758)
  - Henry Howard, 4th Earl of Carlisle, English noble and politician (d. 1758)
- August 16 – Réginald Outhier, French astronomer and priest (d. 1774)
- August 19 – Elizabeth Compton, Countess of Northampton, British noble (d. 1741)
- August 20
  - Stephanus Versluys, Dutch colonial governor (d. 1736)
  - Christiane Charlotte of Württemberg-Winnental, German noble (d. 1729)
- August 23 – Johann Georg Schmidt, engraver from Germany (d. 1767)
- August 25
  - Theodore of Corsica, German noble (d. 1756)
  - Hongxi, prince (d. 1742)
- August 26 – Elisha Williams, American rector of Yale College (d. 1755)
- August 27 – Henry Osborn, Royal Navy admiral (d. 1771)
- August 28 – Charlotte Christine of Brunswick-Wolfenbüttel, Grand Duchess of Russia (d. 1715)
- September 6 – Johann Daniel Schöpflin, German historian (d. 1771)
- September 7 – Johan Ludvig Holstein, Danish politician (d. 1763)
- September 9 – John Vanderbank, British artist (d. 1739)
- September 12 – Johan von Mangelsen, Norwegian businessman and general (d. 1769)
- September 13 – Yeongjo of Joseon, 21st King of Joseon Dynasty in Korean history (d. 1776)
- September 18 – Jacques-Ignace de La Touche, painter (d. 1781)
- September 22 – Philip Stanhope, 4th Earl of Chesterfield, British statesman and man of letters (d. 1773)
- September 25 – Henry Pelham, Prime Minister of the United Kingdom (d. 1754)
- September 26 – Martin Schmid, Swiss composer and architect (d. 1772)

=== October–December ===
- October 4
  - George Murray, Scottish Jacobite general (d. 1760)
  - Tsarevna Praskovya Ivanovna of Russia, daughter of Tsar Ivan V of Russia (d. 1731)
- October 9 – Marquard Herrgott, German Benedictine historian and diplomat (d. 1762)
- October 14 – Jacob Bouverie, 1st Viscount Folkestone, British politician (d. 1761)
- October 15
  - Archibald Douglas, 1st Duke of Douglas, Scottish nobleman (d. 1761)
  - William Knollys, English politician from Oxfordshire (d. 1740)
- October 18 – René Louis de Voyer de Paulmy d'Argenson, French statesman (d. 1757)
- October 24 – Humphrey Sydenham, British politician (d. 1757)
- October 26
  - Sir George Oxenden, 5th Baronet, English politician (d. 1775)
  - Johan Helmich Roman, Swedish Baroque composer (d. 1758)
- October 27 – Simon Pelloutier, German historian (d. 1757)
- November 2 – Count Palatine Joseph Charles of Sulzbach, Heir apparent of Neuburg, Sulzbach and the Palatinate (d. 1729)
- November 3
  - John May, English shipwright (d. 1779)
  - William Mackworth Praed, British politician (d. 1752)
- November 5 – Ricardo Wall, Irish-born soldier, diplomat and minister in the Spanish service (d. 1777)
- November 12 – Augustine Washington, British-American planter, slave owner, and the father of George Washington (d. 1743)
- November 16 – Isabella Simons, banker in the Austrian Netherlands (d. 1756)
- November 21 – Voltaire, French writer, historian, and philosopher (d. 1778)
- November 23 – Charlotte Daneau de Muy, Canadian historian (d. 1759)
- November 26 – Louis de Boissy, French writer (d. 1758)
- November 29 – Leopold, Prince of Anhalt-Köthen, German prince and ruler of the principality of Anhalt-Köthen (d. 1728)
- December 2 – William Shirley, British governor of Massachusetts and then of the Bahamas (d. 1771)
- December 10 – Vittorio Francesco, Marquis of Susa, Prince of Savoy (d. 1762)
- December 11 – Johann Michael von Loën, German author (d. 1776)
- December 20 – Andrew Johnston, American politician (d. 1762)
- December 22 – Hermann Samuel Reimarus, German philosopher and writer (d. 1768)
- December 24
  - Louisa Berkeley, Countess of Berkeley, British noble (d. 1716)
  - Christfried Kirch, German astronomer (d. 1740)

1695

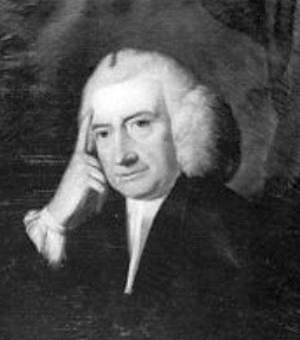
William Borlase born 2 February

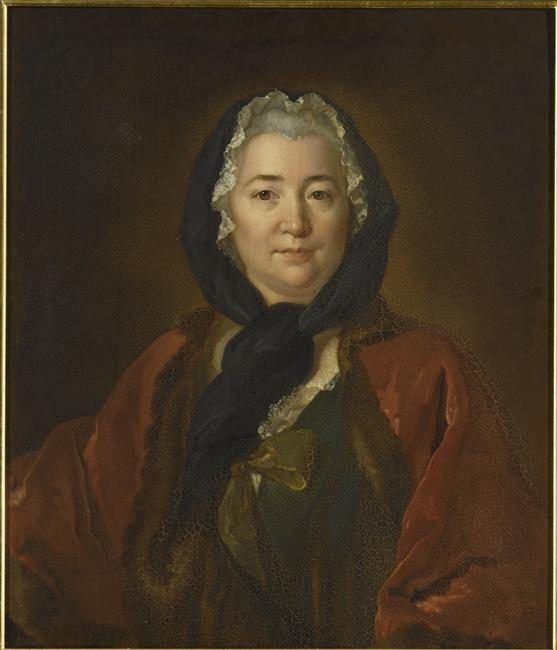
Françoise de Graffigny born 11 February

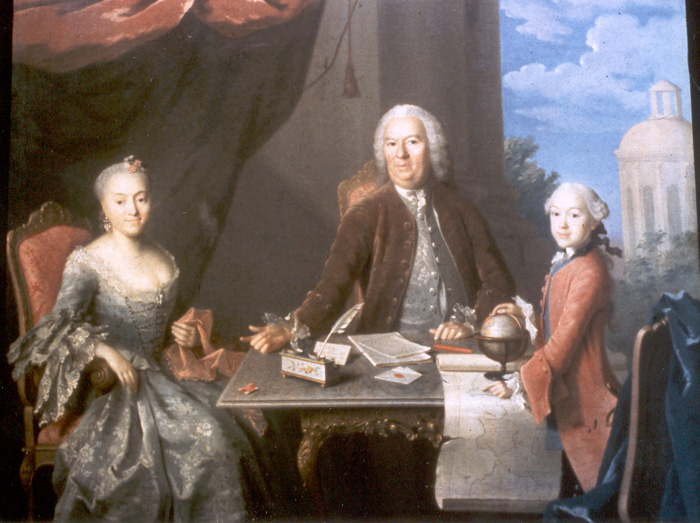
Abraham Pelt born 11 February

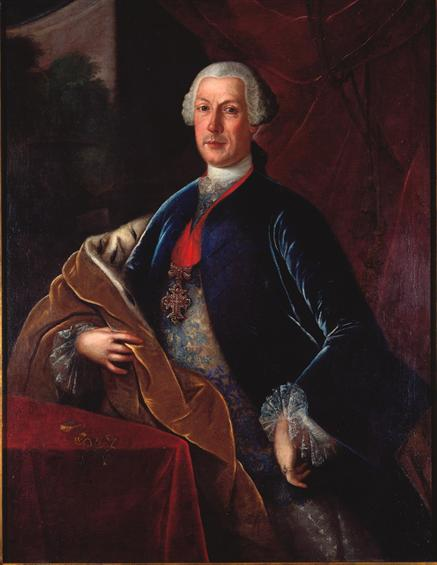
Infante António of Portugal born 15 March

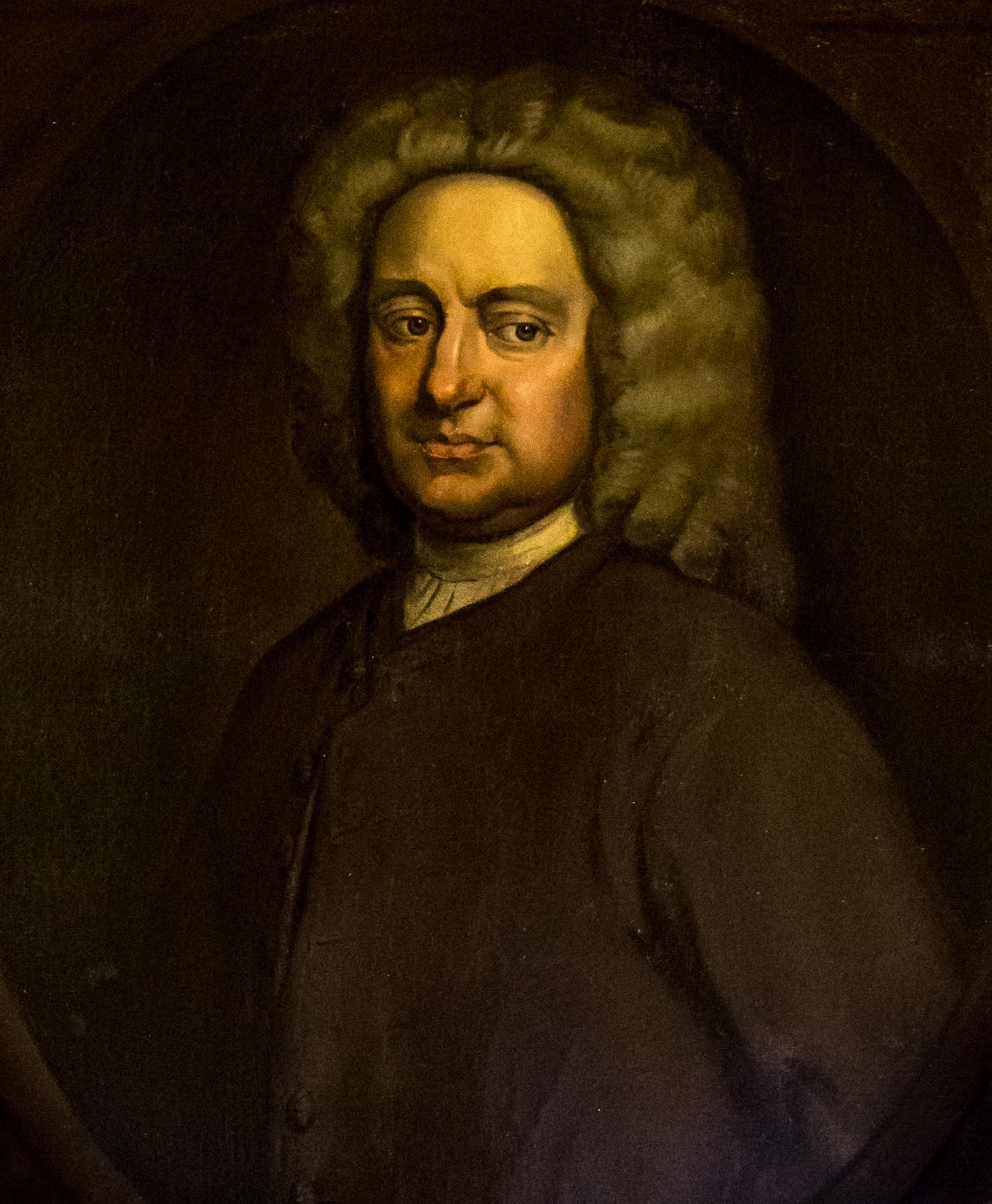
William Greene (colonial governor) born 16 March

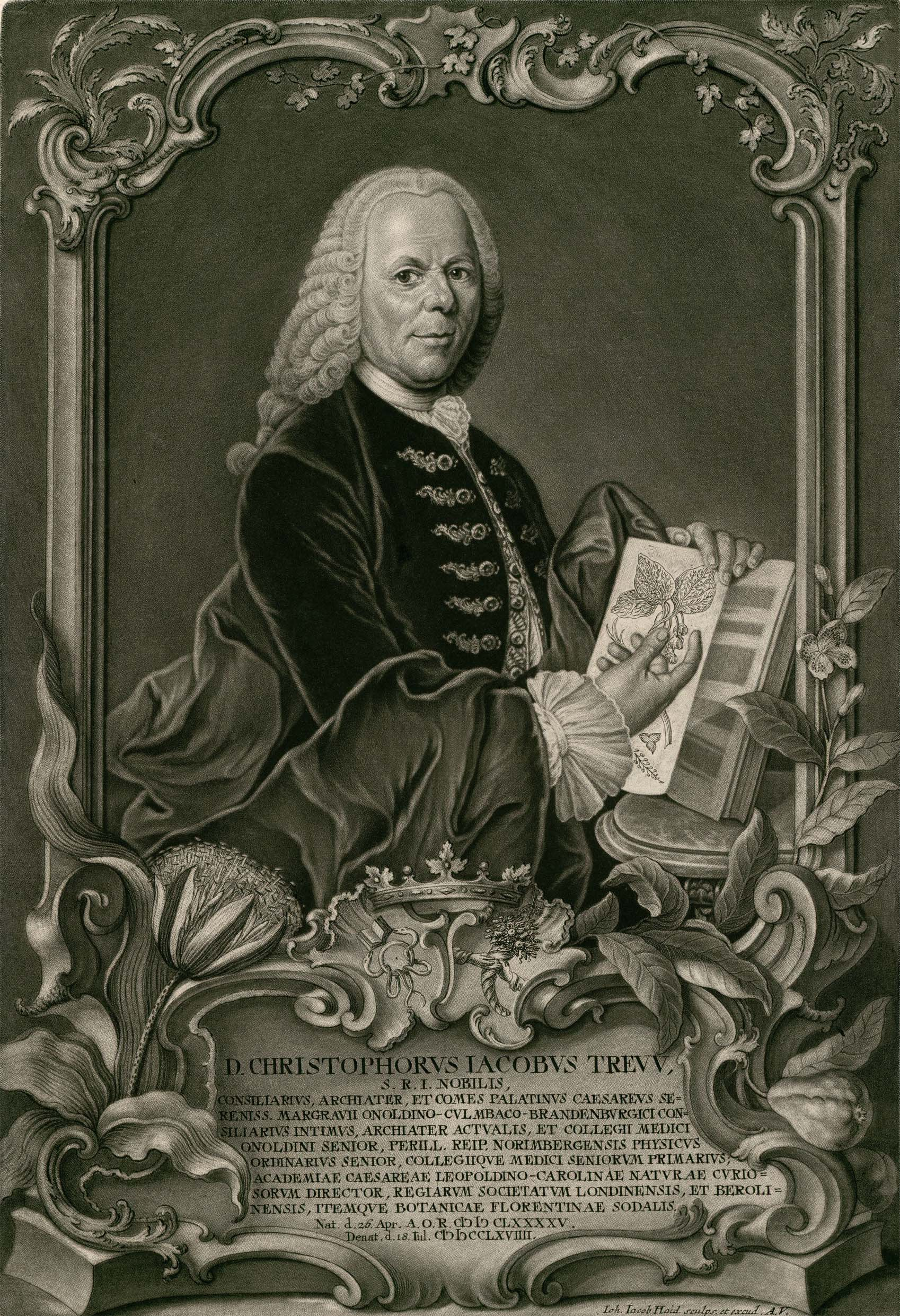
Christoph Jacob Trew born 16 April

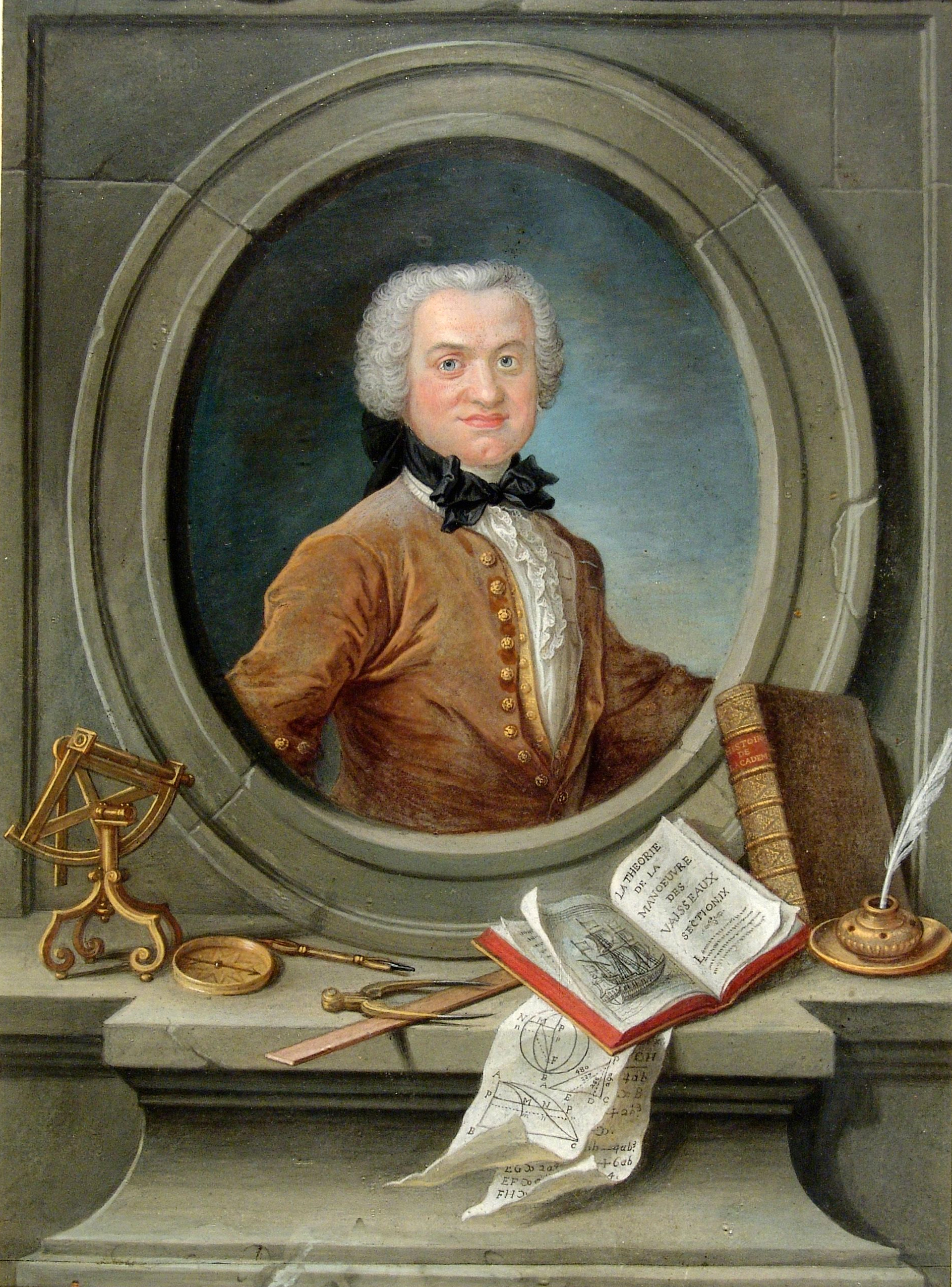
Henri Pitot born 3 May

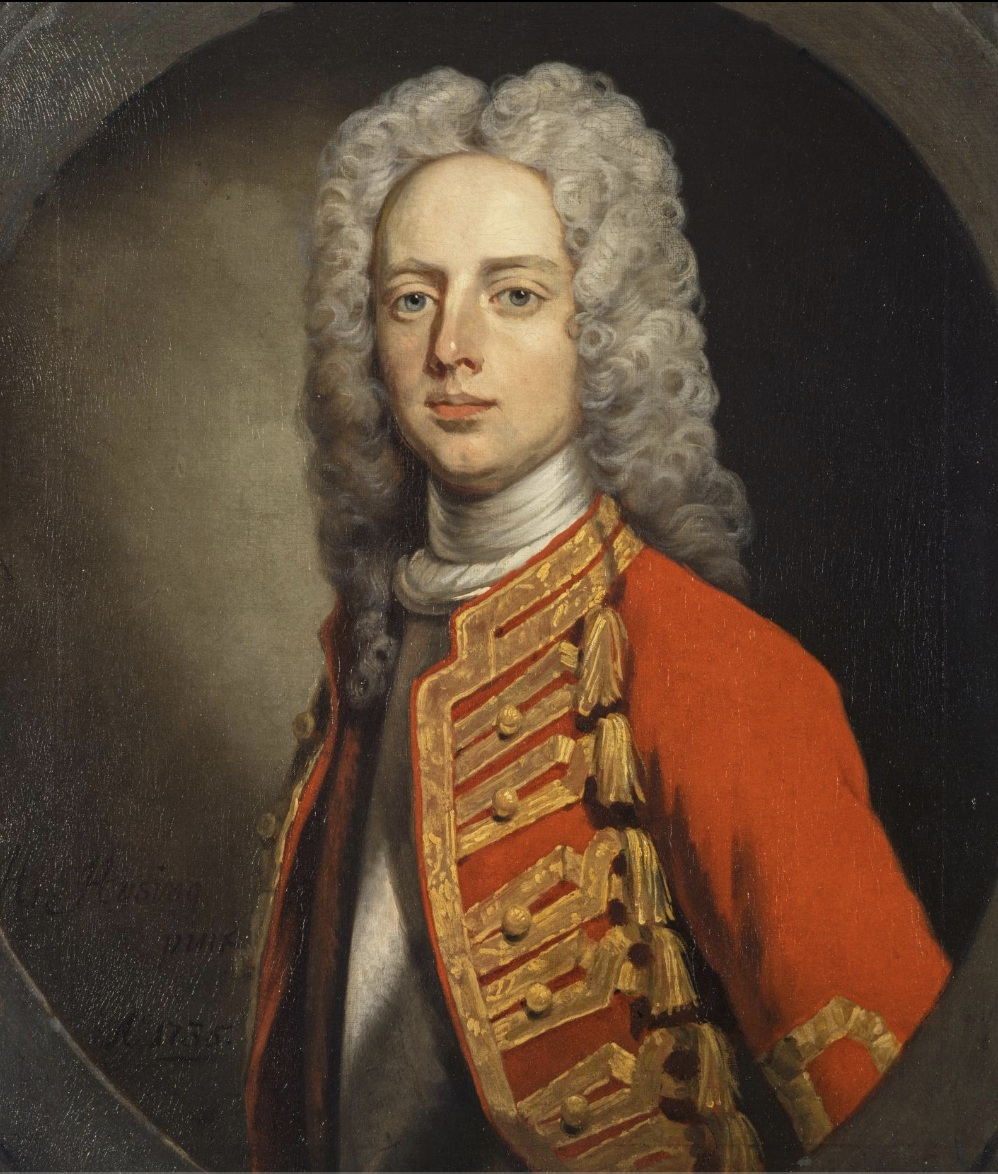
Sir Peter Halkett, 2nd Baronet born 21 June

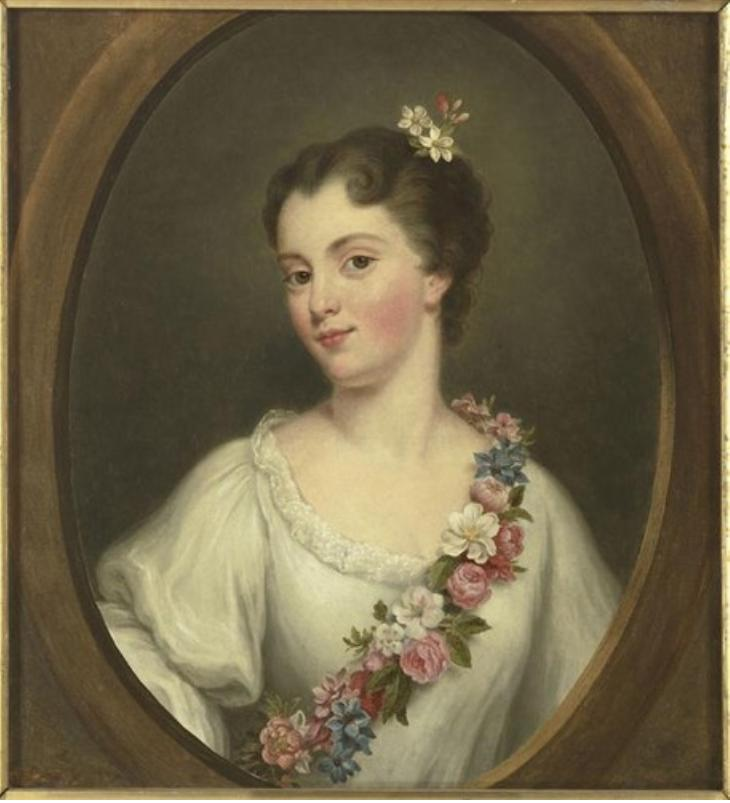
Louise Anne de Bourbon born 23 June

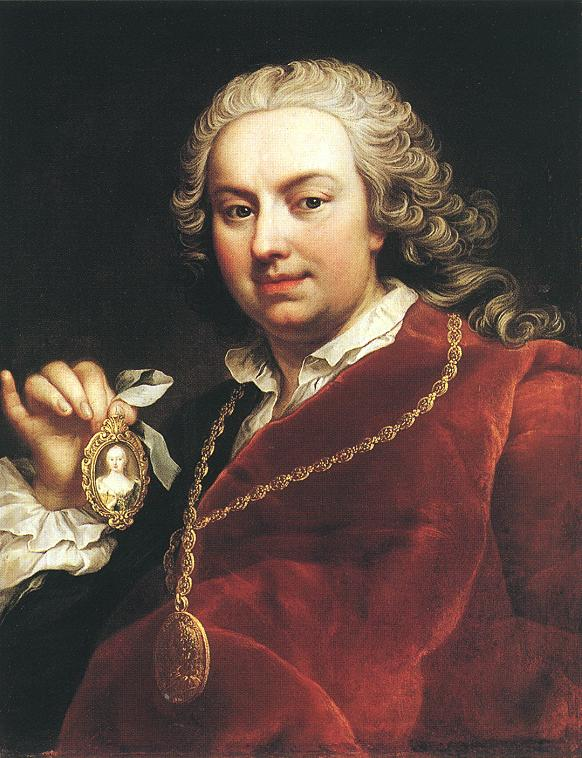
Martin van Meytens born 24 June

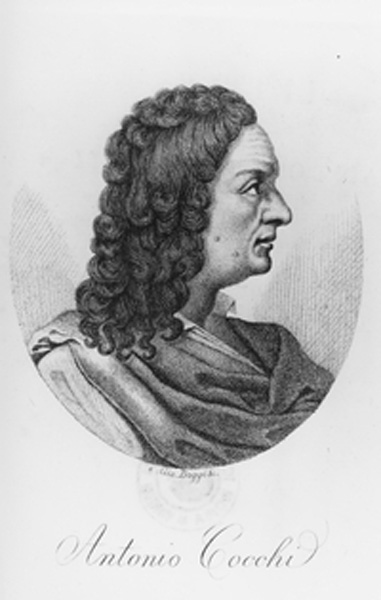
Antonio Cocchi born 3 August

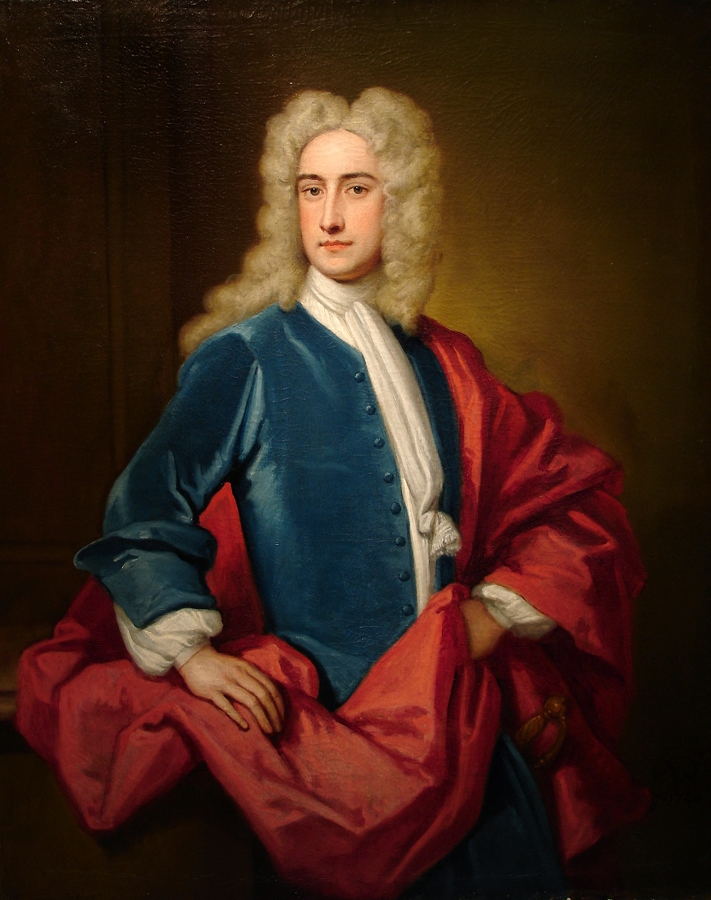
Samuel Sandys, 1st Baron Sandys born 10 August

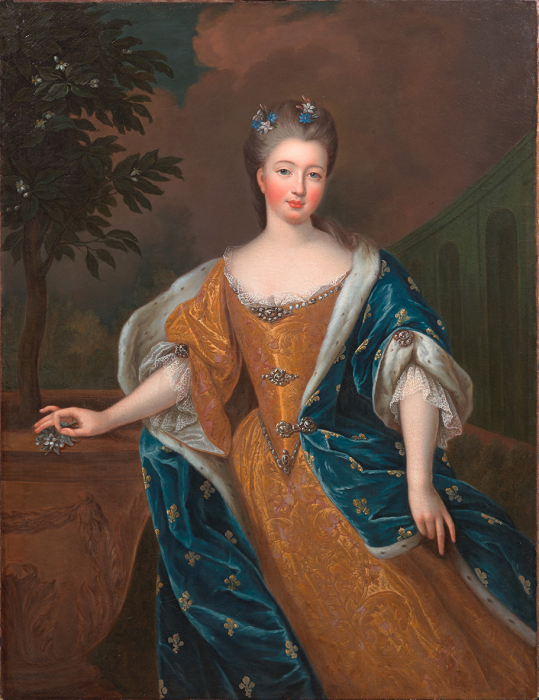
Marie Louise Élisabeth d'Orléans born 20 August

=== January–March ===
- January 2 – Sir Robert Cotton, 3rd Baronet, British politician (d. 1748)
- January 6 – Giuseppe Sammartini, Italian composer and oboist (d. 1750)
- January 9 – Ferdinand Ashmall, British clergy (d. 1798)
- January 18 – Paul Bécart de Granville et de Fonville, French colonial officer (d. 1754)
- January 25
  - Prince Francis Ernest of Hesse-Darmstadt, German aristocrat (d. 1716)
  - Satake Yoshitada (d. 1715), Japanese daimyō
- January 26 – José Quer y Martínez, Spanish botanist (d. 1764)
- January 27 – Anne Howard, Countess of Effingham, British countess (d. 1774)
- February 2
  - William Borlase, English antiquarian, geologist and naturalist (d. 1772)
  - François de Chevert, French general (d. 1769)
  - Christoph Sauer, German-American printer and publisher (d. 1757)
- February 6 – Nicolaus II Bernoulli, Russian mathematician (d. 1726)
- February 10 – Armand Jules de Rohan-Guéméné, French archbishop (d. 1762)
- February 11
  - Françoise de Graffigny, French writer (d. 1758)
  - Abraham Pelt, Danish industrialist and philanthropist (d. 1783)
- February 13 – Francesco Maria Della Rovere, politician (d. 1768)
- February 14 – Joseph Anton Glantschnigg, painter of German origin (d. 1755)
- February 16 – Philippe-Claude de Montboissier de Beaufort, French politician (d. 1765)
- February 21 – Anthony Grey, Earl of Harold, English noble (d. 1723)
- March 2 – Bernhard Christoph Breitkopf, German music publisher (d. 1777)
- March 3 – María Anna Águeda de San Ignacio, Mexican writer (d. 1756)
- March 4 – Marie Huber, Genevan writer and theologian (d. 1753)
- March 9 – Martín Sarmiento, Spanish scholar and writer (d. 1772)
- March 10 – Adrien Manglard, French painter and engraver (d. 1760)
- March 12 – Mihael Summa, Albanian clergyman and auxiliary bishop (d. 1777)
- March 13 – Daniel Overbeek, Dutch colonial governor (d. 1751)
- March 15
  - Infante António of Portugal, Portuguese infante (d. 1757)
  - Alexander Joseph Sulkowski, Polish and Saxon general (d. 1762)
- March 16
  - Christian Hilfgott Brand, German Austrian painter (d. 1756)
  - William Greene, Governor of the Colony of Rhode Island and Providence Plantations (d. 1758)
- March 19
  - William Noel, English barrister, judge and politician, (d. 1762)
  - Christian Seybold, German painter (d. 1768)
- March 20 – Toki Yoritoshi, Daimyo in the Tokugawa shogunate (d. 1744)
- March 27 – Johann Philipp Anton von Franckenstein, German priest (d. 1753)

=== April–June ===
- April 8 – Johann Christian Günther, German poet (d. 1723)
- April 14 – Pietro Guarneri, Italian luthier (d. 1762)
- April 16 – Christoph Jacob Trew, German physician and botanist (d. 1769)
- April 17 – Ludovico Valenti, Italian cardinal (d. 1763)
- April 19
  - Roger Morris, English architect (d. 1749)
  - Georg Albrecht of Saxe-Weissenfels, Count of Barby, German noble, Count of Barby (d. 1739)
- May 1 – Pierre Saint-Sevin, French composer (d. 1768)
- May 2 – Giovanni Niccolò Servandoni, French architect and painter (d. 1766)
- May 3
  - Pacifico Bizza, Roman Catholic archbishop (d. 1756)
  - Henri Pitot, French hydraulic engineer (d. 1771)
- May 6 – Isaac Wilkinson, English businessman (d. 1784)
- May 7
  - Sir Robert Grosvenor, 6th Baronet, British politician (d. 1755)
  - Gabriel Huquier, French art dealer (d. 1772)
- May 8 – John Lee, British politician (d. 1761)
- May 16 – Louis-Urbain-Aubert de Tourny, French intendant (d. 1760)
- May 22 – Anna Folkema, Engraver from the Northern Netherlands (d. 1768)
- May 27 – Miguel Cabrera, Mexican painter (d. 1768)
- May 28 – Alexander Leslie, 5th Earl of Leven, British politician (d. 1754)
- June 3 – Francis Wise, Keeper of the archive at the University of Oxford (d. 1767)
- June 5 – Johann Conrad Schlaun, German architect (d. 1773)
- June 6 – Adriaan Valckenier, Dutch Governor-General of the Dutch East Indies (1737-1741) (d. 1751)
- June 14 – Johann Friedrich Walther, German teacher, organist and draughtsman (d. 1776)
- June 17 – Henri-Michel Guedier de Saint-Aubin, French theologist (d. 1741)
- June 21
  - Joseph Banks, English landowner and MP (d. 1741)
  - Sir Peter Halkett, 2nd Baronet, politician (d. 1755)
- June 23 – Louise Anne de Bourbon, French princess, the daughter of Louis III de Bourbon (d. 1758)
- June 24 – Martin van Meytens, Austrian artist (d. 1770)
- June 28 – Christiana Mariana von Ziegler, German poet (d. 1760)

=== July–September ===
- July 2
  - Sir Orlando Bridgeman, 4th Baronet, British politician 1695–1764 (d. 1764)
  - Louis Charles César Le Tellier, French military commander and Marshal of France (d. 1771)
- July 6 – Giovanni Francesco II Brignole Sale, Italian politician (d. 1760)
- July 17
  - Alexandre de Gusmão, Portuguese diplomat (d. 1753)
  - Christian Karl Reinhard of Leiningen-Dagsburg-Falkenburg, Count of Leiningen-Dagsburg (d. 1766)
  - Alexander Moncrieff, Scottish minister of the Secession church (d. 1761)
- July 18 – Boris Grigoryevich Yusupov, Russian politician (d. 1759)
- July 21 – Thomas Archer, 1st Baron Archer, British politician (d. 1768)
- July 28 – Yunlu, prince Zhuang of the First Rank (d. 1767)
- July 30 – Charles Philippe d'Albert de Luynes, French noble (d. 1758)
- August 1 – John Rutherford, Scottish physician (d. 1779)
- August 3 – Antonio Cocchi, Italian physician and naturalist (d. 1758)
- August 9 – Andreas Murray, Swedish priest (d. 1771)
- August 10 – Samuel Sandys, 1st Baron Sandys, British politician (d. 1770)
- August 11 – Michelangelo Unterberger, Austrian painter (d. 1758)
- August 14 – Mikołaj Krzysztof Radziwiłł, Lithuanian–Polish noble (d. 1715)
- August 17 – Gustaf Lundberg, Swedish rococo painter (d. 1786)
- August 20 – Marie Louise Élisabeth d'Orléans, French princess (d. 1719)
- August 26 – Marie-Anne-Catherine Quinault, French opera singer and composer (d. 1791)
- August 31 – Maximilian, Prince of Hornes, prince (d. 1763)
- September 3 – Pietro Locatelli, Italian Baroque composer and violinist (d. 1764)
- September 5 – Carl Gustaf Tessin, Swedish count, politician and art collector (d. 1770)
- September 6 – Charles Pole, British businessman and politician (d. 1779)
- September 7 – François Hus, French comedian (d. 1774)
- September 10 – Johann Lorenz Bach, German composer (d. 1773)
- September 15 – Michel Lullin de Chateauvieux, Genevan agronomist (d. 1781)
- September 21 – Ferdinando Colonna of Stigliano, 2nd Prince of Sonnino (d. 1775)
- September 22 – Mathias Chardon, French historian (d. 1771)
- September 27 – Anders Anton von Stiernman, Swedish historian (d. 1765)

=== October–December ===
- October 5 – John Glas, Scottish theologian (d. 1773)
- October 23 – François de Cuvilliés, Bavarian architect (d. 1768)
- October 31 – Nicolas-Joseph de Noyelles de Fleurimont, French soldier (d. 1761)
- November 1 – Pablo Maroni, Austrian missionary (d. 1757)
- November 4
  - John Erskine of Carnock, Scottish legal scholar (d. 1768)
  - Fabrizio Serbelloni, Catholic cardinal (d. 1775)
- November 9 – Theodosia Bligh, 10th Baroness Clifton, English peer, born Theodosia Hyde (d. 1722)
- November 10 – John Bevis, English physician and astronomer (d. 1771)
- November 17 – Barthold Douma van Burmania, Dutch diplomat (d. 1766)
- December 1 – Francesco Saverio Quadrio, Italian scholar (d. 1756)
- December 2 – Andrzej Stanisław Załuski, Polish bishop (d. 1758)
- December 11 – Charles Guillaume Loys de Bochat, jurist (d. 1754)
- December 12 – Michael Christoph Hanow, German historian and scientist (d. 1773)
- December 15 – Benigna Marie of Reuss-Ebersdorf, German noblewoman and author of hymns (d. 1751)
- December 18 – David Nitschmann der Bischof, bishop (d. 1772)
- December 19
  - Andrea Locatelli, Italian painter (d. 1741)
  - Joseph Gascoigne Nightingale, British Member of Parliament (d. 1752)
  - Jacob de Wit, Dutch painter (d. 1754)
- December 22 – Rebecca Kellogg Ashley, captive of Native Americans (d. 1757)
- December 26 – Johann Caspar Bachofen, Swiss composer (d. 1755)
- December 29 – Jean-Baptiste Pater, French painter (d. 1736)
- date unknown – Hedvig Catharina De la Gardie, Swedish salonnière (d. 1745)
  - Cai Wan, politically influential Chinese poet (d. 1755)

1696

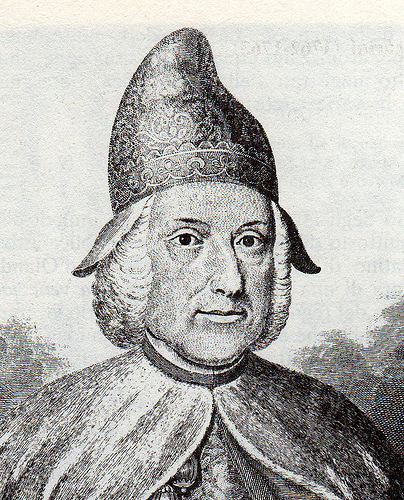
Marco Foscarini born 4 February

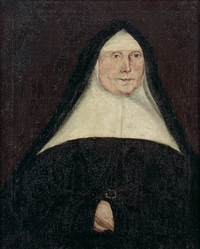
Esther Wheelwright born 10 April

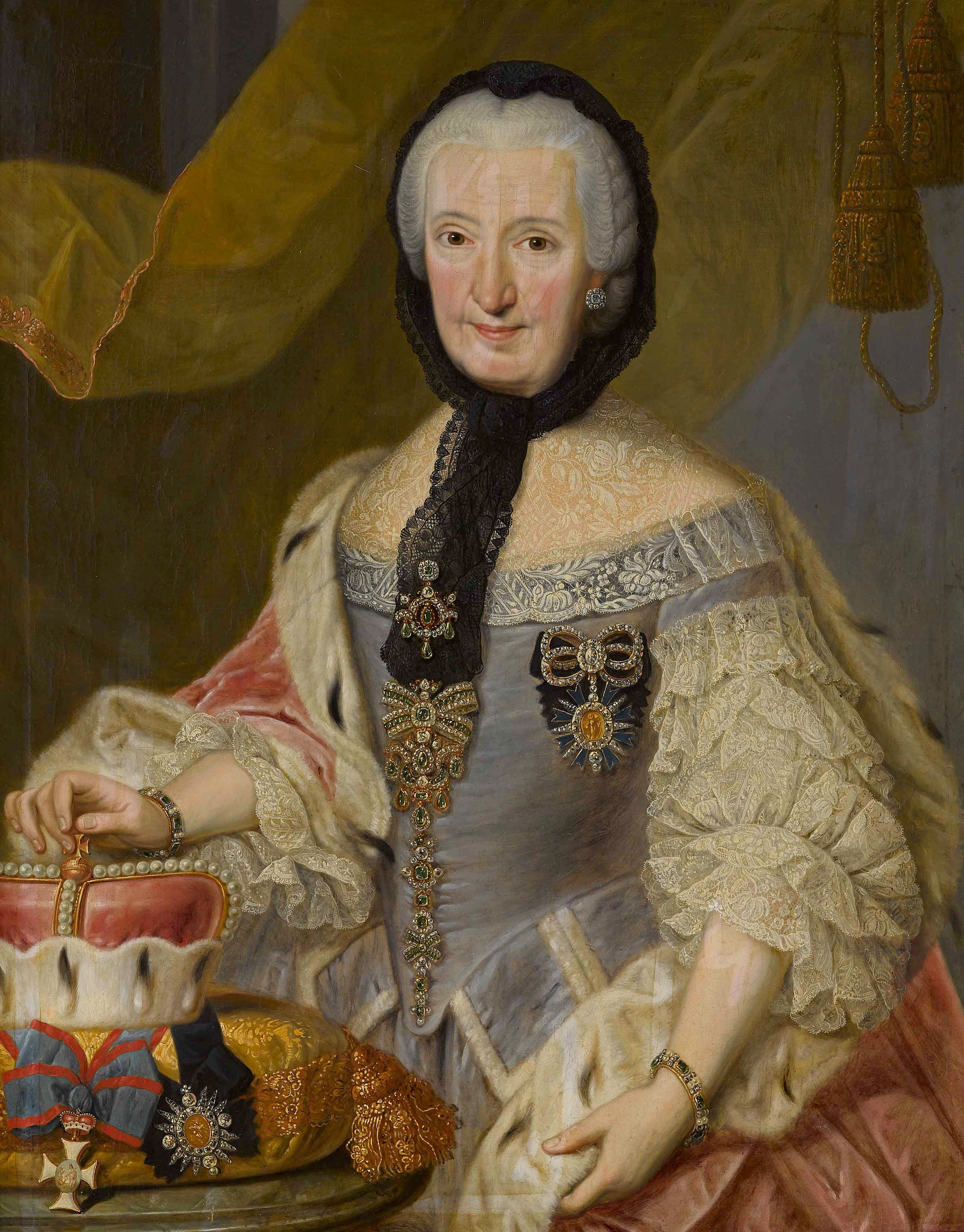
Countess Palatine Franziska Christine of Sulzbach born 16 May

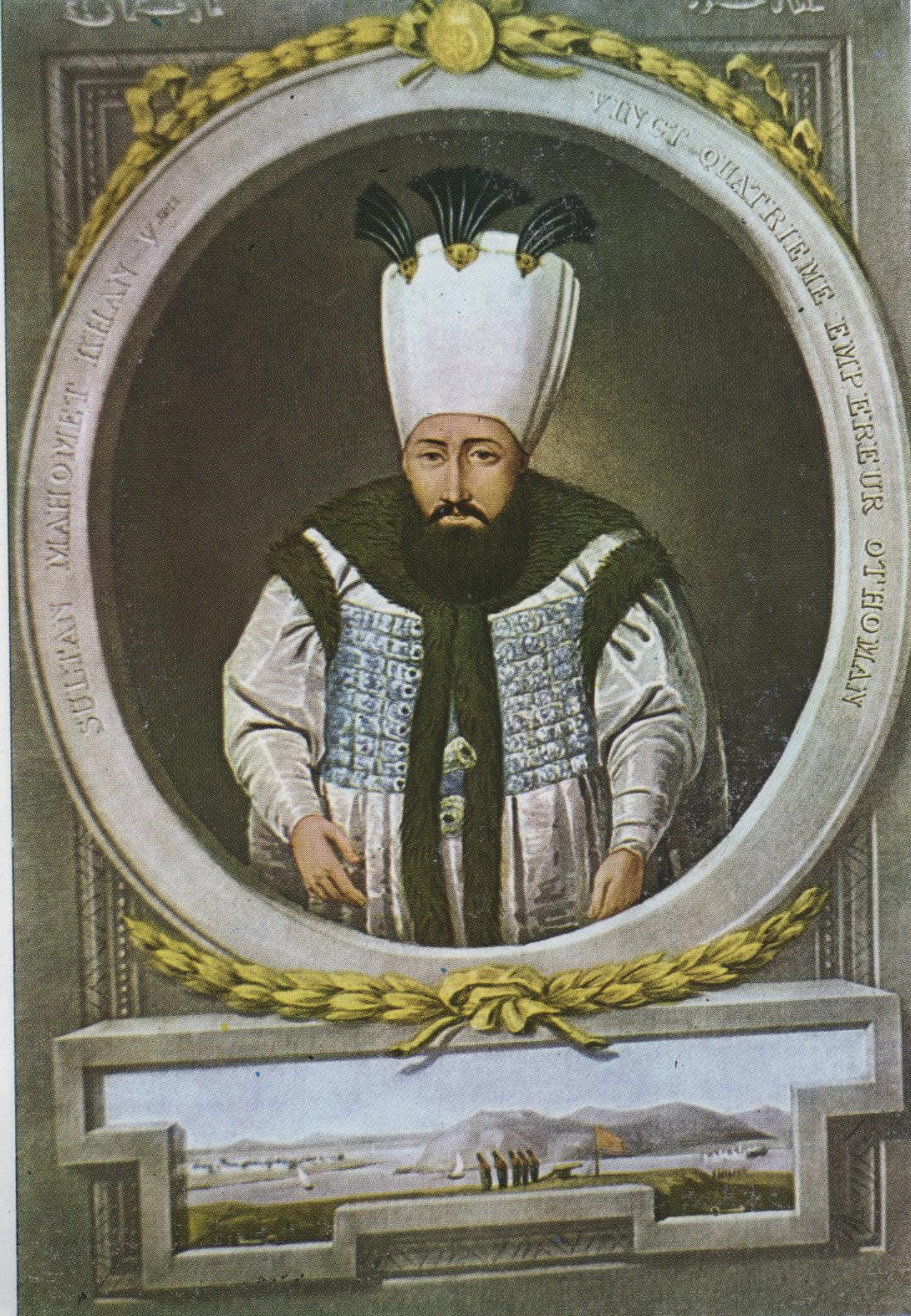
Mahmud I born 2 August

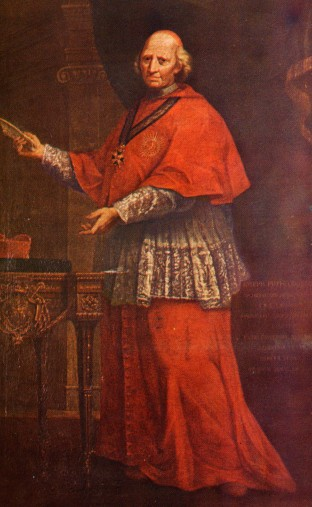
Giuseppe Pozzobonelli born 11 August

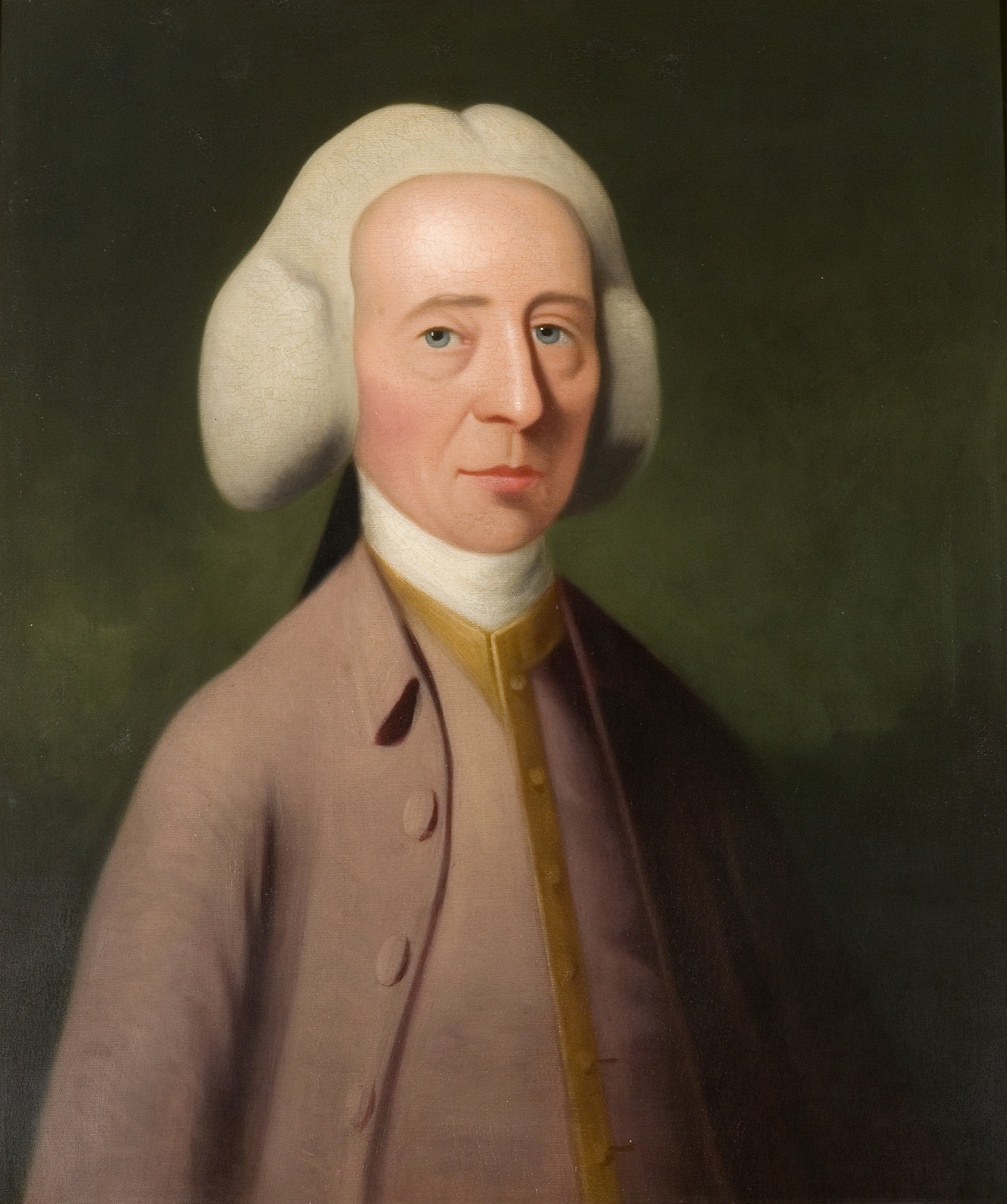
Charles Gray (Colchester MP) born 20 September

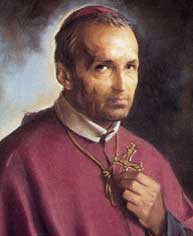
Alphonsus Liguori born 27 September

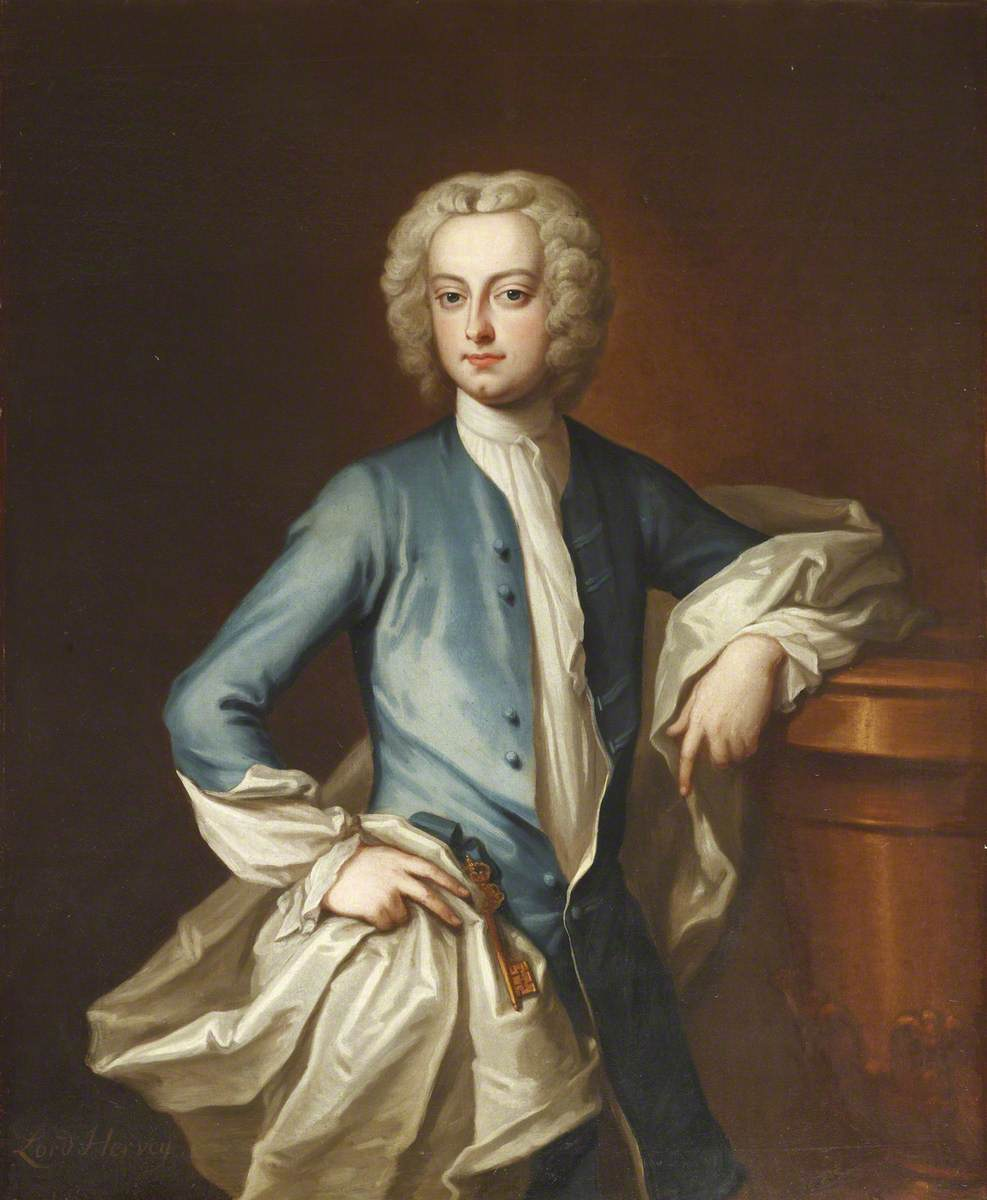
John Hervey, 2nd Baron Hervey born 13 October

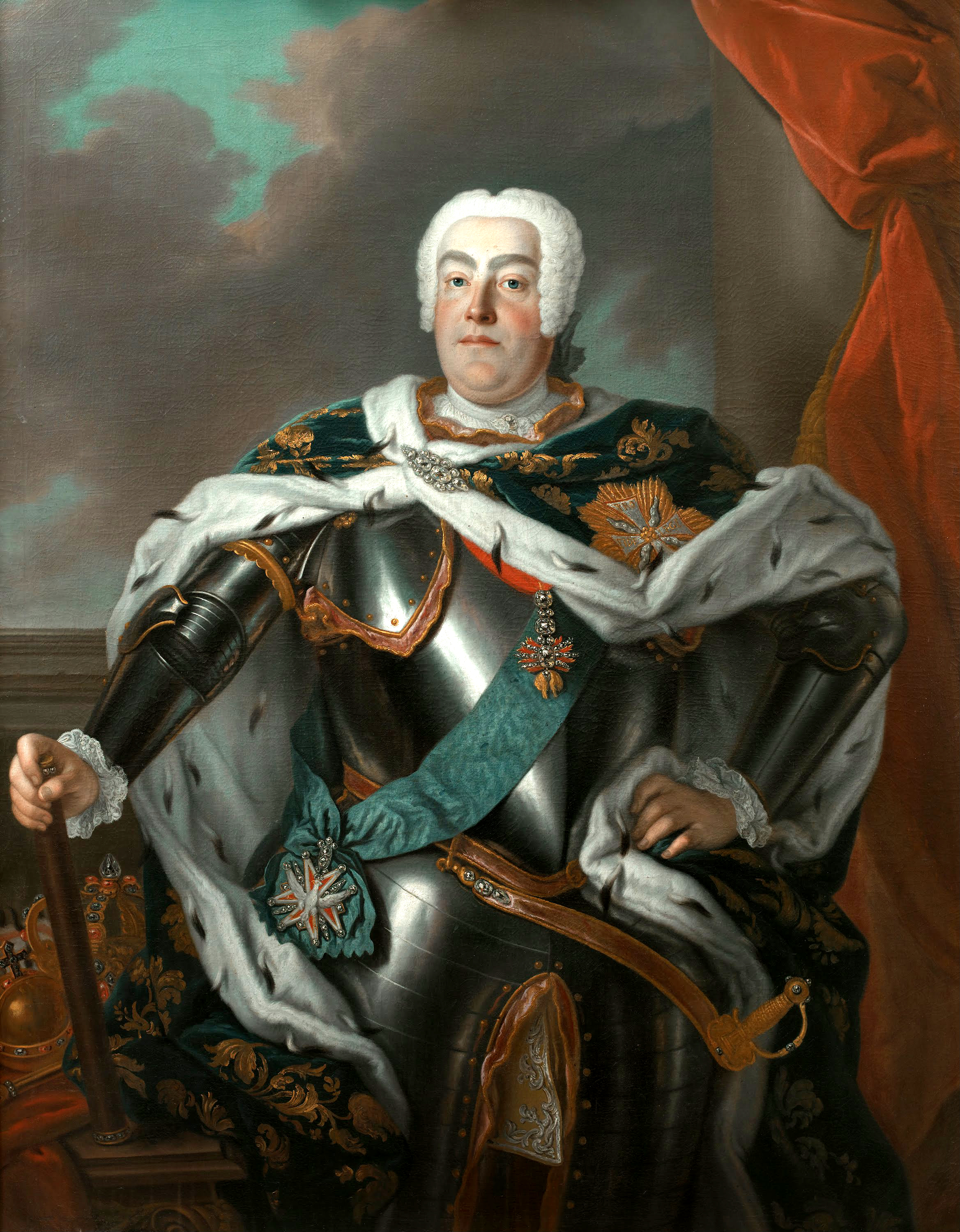
Augustus III of Poland born 17 October

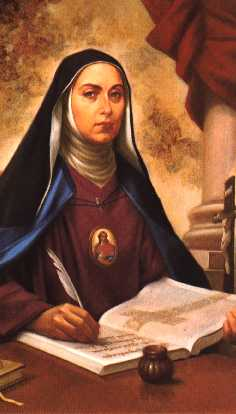
Giulia Crostarosa born 31 October

Conrad Weiser born 2 November

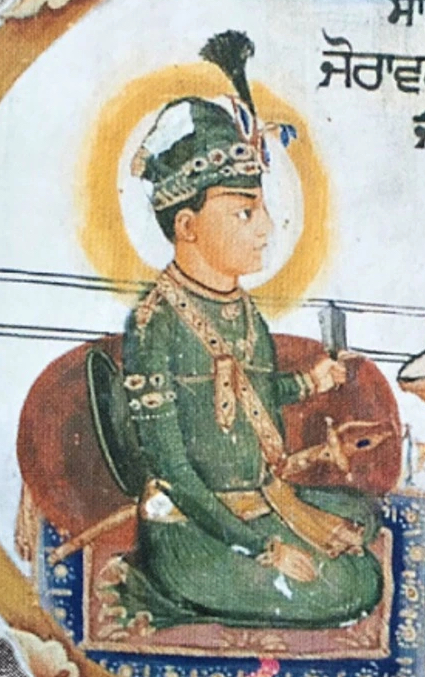
Zorawar Singh (Sikhism) born 17 November

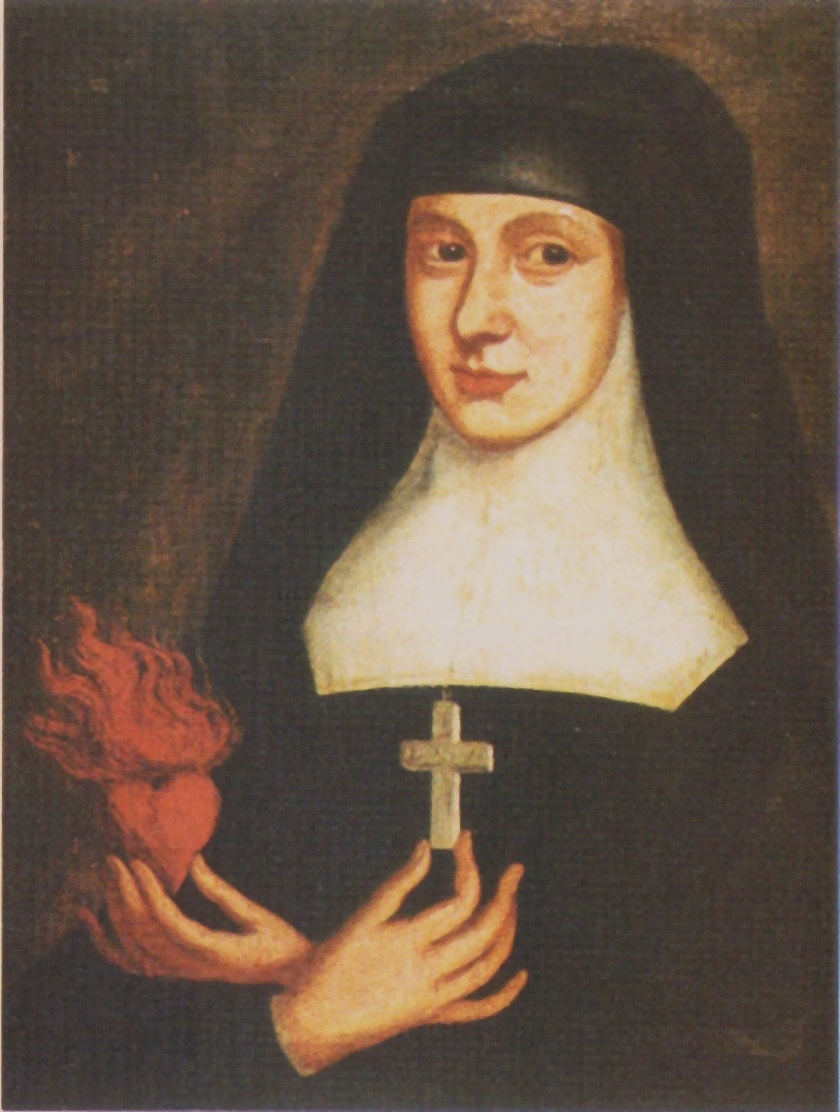
Anne-Madeleine Remuzat born 29 November

=== January–March ===
- January 5 – Giuseppe Galli Bibiena, Italian artist (d. 1757)
- January 8 – Étienne Parrocel, French painter (d. 1775)
- January 11 – Frederick William, Prince of Solms-Braunfels (d. 1761)
- January 14
  - Troiano Acquaviva d'Aragona, Italian cardinal (d. 1747)
  - John Hippisley, English actor and theatre manager (1696–1748) (d. 1748)
- January 17
  - Jean de Beaurain, French geographer (d. 1771)
  - Laurent Delvaux, Flemish sculptor (d. 1778)
  - Ambrose Madison, American planter and politician (d. 1732)
- January 18
  - Ludovico Calini, Italian cardinal (d. 1782)
  - Sebastian Klotz, German violin maker (d. 1775)
- January 22 – Johann Jakob Brucker, German historian of philosophy (d. 1770)
- January 31 – John Wigan, British physician and author (1696–1739) (d. 1739)
- February 2 – Juan José Eguiara y Eguren, Mexican bishop (d. 1763)
- February 3 – Caspar Wistar, American glassmaker (d. 1752)
- February 4 – Marco Foscarini, 117th Doge of Venice (d. 1763)
- February 10 – Johann Melchior Molter, German composer (d. 1765)
- February 17 – Ernst Gottlieb Baron, German composer (d. 1760)
- February 22 – Henrietta Polyxena of Vasaborg, Swedish countess (d. 1777)
- February 25 – Jean-Philippe-René de La Bléterie, French historian and translator (d. 1772)
- February 29 – Esprit Antoine Blanchard, French baroque composer (d. 1770)
- March 5 – Giovanni Battista Tiepolo, Italian painter (d. 1770)
- March 6 – Joseph Anton Feuchtmayer, German sculptor (d. 1770)
- March 10 – John Campbell, 3rd Earl of Breadalbane and Holland, Scottish nobleman, diplomat and politician (d. 1782)
- March 13 – Armand de Vignerot du Plessis, French diplomat (d. 1788)
- March 15 – François-Arnoul Poisson de Roinville, French actor (d. 1753)
- March 17 – Lajos Batthyány, Hungarian palatine (d. 1765)
- March 18 – Domenico Maria Fratta, Italian painter and draughtsman (d. 1763)
- March 21 – Pierre Février, French composer, organist, and harpsichordist (d. 1760)
- March 23 – Johann Erhard Kapp, German author and historian (d. 1756)
- March 27
  - Antoine Court, French Huguenot minister (d. 1760)
  - Charles Ingram, British army officer (d. 1748)
- March 30
  - Ayşe Sultan, daughter of Ottoman Sultan Mustafa II (d. 1752)
  - John Worsley, scholar (d. 1767)

=== April–June ===
- April 2 – Francesca Cuzzoni, Italian operatic soprano (d. 1778)
- April 3 – Diego Bernardo de Peredo y Navarrete, Mexican Roman Catholic clergyman, bishop of Yucatán (d. 1774)
- April 6
  - Charles Beauclerk, 2nd Duke of St Albans, British politician (d. 1751)
  - Richard Grey, priest (d. 1771)
- April 8 – Wichmann Lastrop, Hamburg merchant and grand burgher (d. 1747)
- April 10 – Esther Wheelwright, Ursuline nun (d. 1780)
- April 12 – Joseph Atwell, English cleric (d. 1768)
- April 14 – Princess Antoinette of Brunswick-Wolfenbüttel, German duchess (d. 1762)
- April 15 – François Morellon la Cave, French engraver (d. 1768)
- April 19 – Burchard Mauchart, German anatomist and surgeon (d. 1751)
- April 20 – Curtis Barnett, Royal Navy officer (d. 1746)
- April 21 – Francesco de Mura, Italian painter (d. 1782)
- April 26 – Michał Fryderyk Czartoryski, Polish noble (d. 1775)
- April 27 – John Lyon, 5th Earl of Strathmore and Kinghorne, Scottish Earl (d. 1715)
- May 2 – Thomas Chester, British Member of Parliament (d. 1763)
- May 4 – Louis de Cormontaigne, French engineer (d. 1752)
- May 7 – Eleonore Wilhelmine of Anhalt-Köthen, German noblewoman (d. 1726)
- May 11 – George Crowle, British Whig MP (d. 1754)
- May 16 – Countess Palatine Franziska Christine of Sulzbach, Abess of Thorn and Abbess of Essen (d. 1776)
- May 22 – William Rathbone II, British businessman (d. 1746)
- May 23 – Johann Caspar Vogler, German composer (d. 1763)
- May 28 – Giovanni Lorenzo Berti, Italian theologian (d. 1766)
- June 5 – Peregrine Hopson, British Army general (d. 1759)
- June 6 – Peter Spaak, Swedish Protestant reformer (d. 1759)
- June 9 – Shivaji II, Ruler of Maratha Empire (d. 1726)
- June 11 – James Francis Edward Keith, Scottish soldier and Prussian field marshal (d. 1758)
- June 14 – Al-Mansur al-Husayn II, imam (d. 1748)
- June 18 – Friedrich August von Harrach-Rohrau, plenipotentiary minister of the Austrian Netherlands (d. 1749)
- June 21 – John Gibbes, English military officer in the province of Carolina (d. 1764)
- June 27 – William Pepperrell, English colonial soldier (d. 1759)

=== July–September ===
- July 14
  - Buenaventura Blanco y Elguero, Roman Catholic bishop (d. 1764)
  - William Oldys, English antiquarian and bibliographer, Norroy king-at-arms (d. 1761)
- July 22 – Eric Julius Biörner, state official and a scholar of ancient history (d. 1750)
- July 24 – Benning Wentworth, Colonial governor of New Hampshire (d. 1770)
- July 27 – Samuel Whittemore, American farmer and oldest known colonial combatant of the American Revolution (d. 1793)
- July 28 – Élisabeth Bégon, French writer (d. 1755)
- July 31 – Dumont de Montigny, French colonial officer, farmer, and author (d. 1760)
- August 2 – Mahmud I, Sultan of the Ottoman Empire from 1730 to 1754 (d. 1754)
- August 4 – Christian August I, Duke of Schleswig-Holstein-Sonderburg-Augustenburg (d. 1754)
- August 6 – Johann Gregor Herold, German painter (d. 1775)
- August 7 – Samuel Waldo, American businessman, land speculator, and militia general (d. 1759)
- August 8 – Jean Girard, Canadian musician (d. 1765)
- August 9 – Joseph Wenzel I, Prince of Liechtenstein, Austrian marshall (d. 1772)
- August 11 – Giuseppe Pozzobonelli, Archbishop of Milan (d. 1783)
- August 12 – Maurice Greene, English composer and organist (d. 1755)
- August 16 – Marc-Pierre de Voyer de Paulmy d'Argenson, French politician (d. 1764)
- August 17 – John Thomas, Bishop of Winchester, of Salisbury and of Peterborough (d. 1781)
- September 7 – Christoph Friedrich von Lattorf, German military personnel (d. 1762)
- September 8 – Basil Hamilton, British Member of Parliament (d. 1742)
- September 13
  - Johann Caspar Bagnato, German architect (d. 1757)
  - Christoph Ludwig von Stille, Prussian Major General (d. 1752)
- September 14 – Batty Langley, British garden designer (d. 1751)
- September 17 – Eunice Kanenstenhawi Williams, Native American captive (d. 1785)
- September 18 – Thomas Hunt, English academic, Oxford Laudian Professor of Arabic (d. 1774)
- September 20 – Charles Gray, British politician (d. 1782)
- September 25
  - Sir Archibald Grant, 2nd Baronet, Scottish politician (d. 1778)
  - Marie Anne de Vichy-Chamrond, marquise du Deffand, French salon-holder (d. 1780)
- September 27
  - Sir John St Aubyn, 3rd Baronet, British politician (d. 1744)
  - Hendrik Carré II, Dutch painter (d. 1775)
  - Alphonsus Liguori, Italian founder of the Redemptorist Order (d. 1787)
- September 30 – Jean-François de La Clue-Sabran, French admiral of the Seven Years' War (d. 1764)

=== October–December ===
- October 2
  - John Blackwood, British Member of Parliament (d. 1777)
  - Ann Smith Franklin, American colonial newspaper printer and publisher (d. 1763)
- October 10 – Chen Hongmou, Chinese official and philosopher (d. 1771)
- October 13 – John Hervey, 2nd Baron Hervey, English courtier, political writer and memoirist (d. 1743)
- October 14 – Samuel Johnson, President of Columbia University (d. 1772)
- October 17 – Augustus III of Poland, King of Poland, Elector of Saxony (d. 1763)
- October 20 – Ludwig, Prince of Hohenlohe-Langenburg, Count and later Prince of Hohenlohe-Langenburg (d. 1765)
- October 21
  - Charles Louis, Count of Marsan, French noble (d. 1755)
  - John Manners, 3rd Duke of Rutland, English nobleman (d. 1779)
  - James Fitz-James Stuart, 2nd Duke of Berwick, Jacobite and Spanish general and noble (d. 1738)
- October 28 – Maurice de Saxe, Marshal General of France (d. 1750)
- October 31 – Giulia Crostarosa, Italian catholic nun and foundress (d. 1755)
- November 1 – Karl Ferdinand von Königsegg-Erps, Belgian politician (d. 1759)
- November 2
  - Louise Adélaïde de Bourbon, French noble (d. 1750)
  - Conrad Weiser, Pennsylvania's interpreter and emissary to the Native Americans (d. 1760)
- November 7 – Heinrich von Manteuffel, German military personnel (d. 1778)
- November 11 – Andrea Zani, Italian violinist and composer (d. 1757)
- November 12 – Theophilus Hastings, 9th Earl of Huntingdon, English noble (d. 1746)
- November 17
  - Samuel Cluckston, Connecticut politician (d. 1751)
  - Zorawar Singh, Sikh martyr (d. 1705)
- November 19 – Louis Tocqué, French painter (d. 1772)
- November 22 – Tokugawa Muneharu, A daimyo in the mid-Edo period (d. 1764)
- November 29 – Anne-Madeleine Remuzat, French nun recognized as venerable (d. 1730)
- December 1 – Francis Burton, Irish politician (d. 1744)
- December 2 – Daniel de Superville, ⁭founded University of Erlangen-Nuremberg (d. 1773)
- December 13
  - Egid Verhelst the Elder, Flemish sculptor (d. 1749)
  - Safiye Sultan, daughter of Ottoman Sultan Mustafa II (d. 1778)
- December 22 – James Oglethorpe, English general and founder of the state of Georgia as a colony (d. 1785)
- December 25 – Prince Johann Ernst of Saxe-Weimar, composer (d. 1715)
- December 31 – Thomas Winnington, British politician (d. 1746)
- date unknown
  - William Beverley, American legislator, civil servant, planter, and landowner (d. 1756)
  - Christine Kirch, German astronomer (d. 1782)
  - Carlo Zimech, Maltese priest and painter (d. 1766)

1697

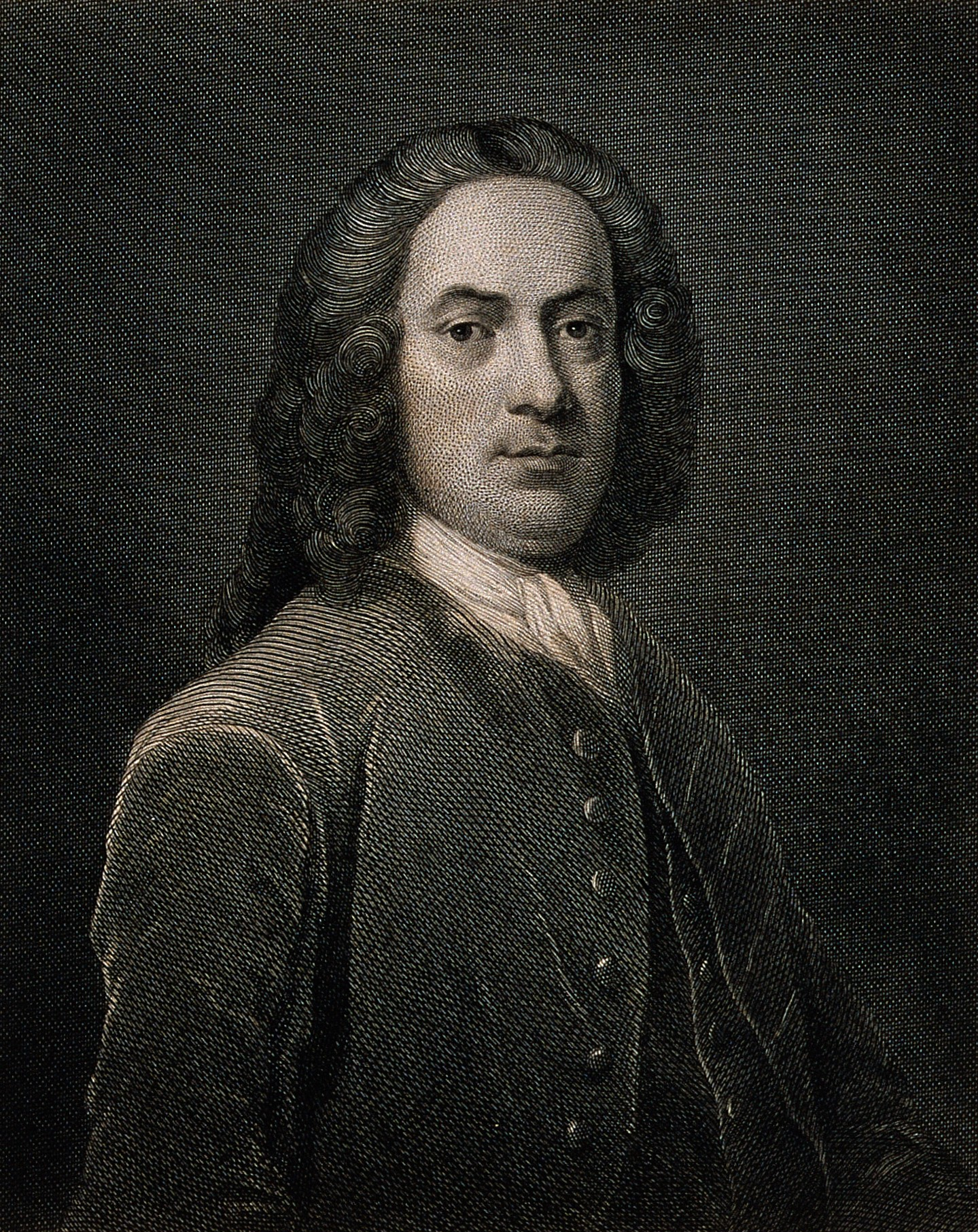
William Smellie (obstetrician) born 5 February

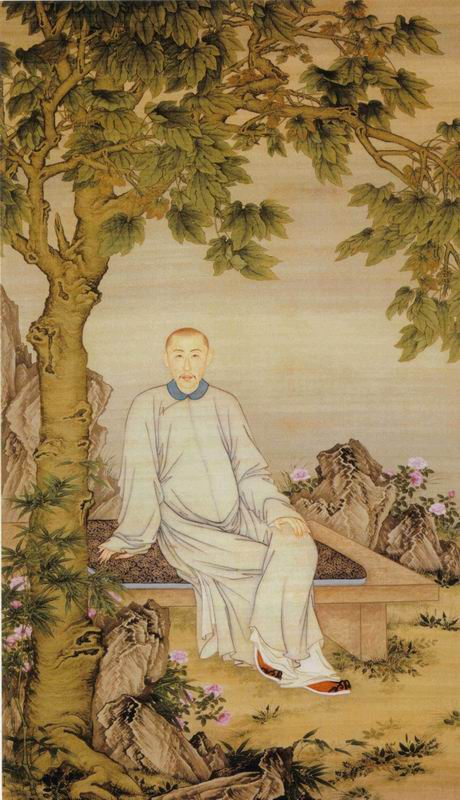
Yunli born 24 March

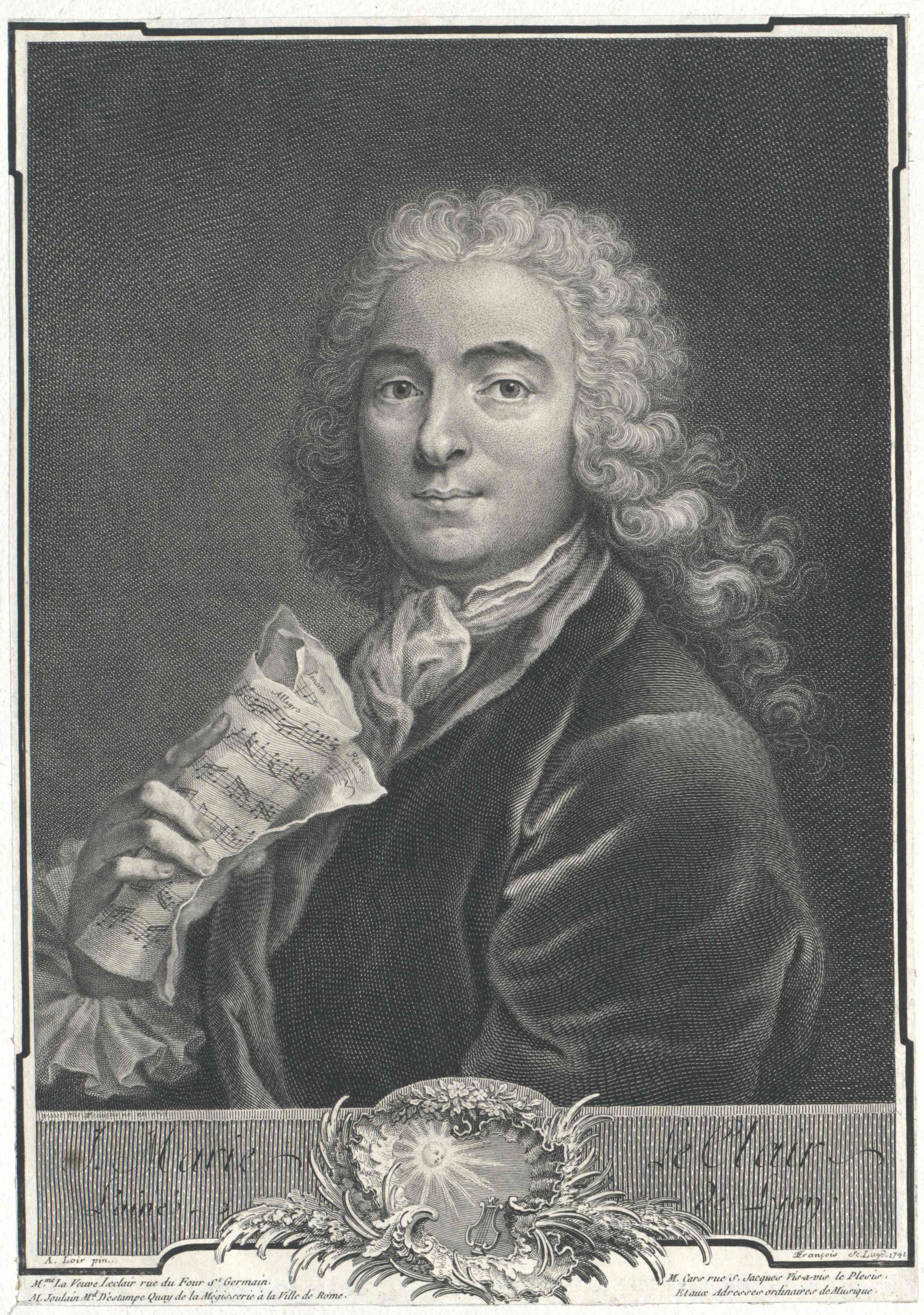
Jean-Marie Leclair born 10 May

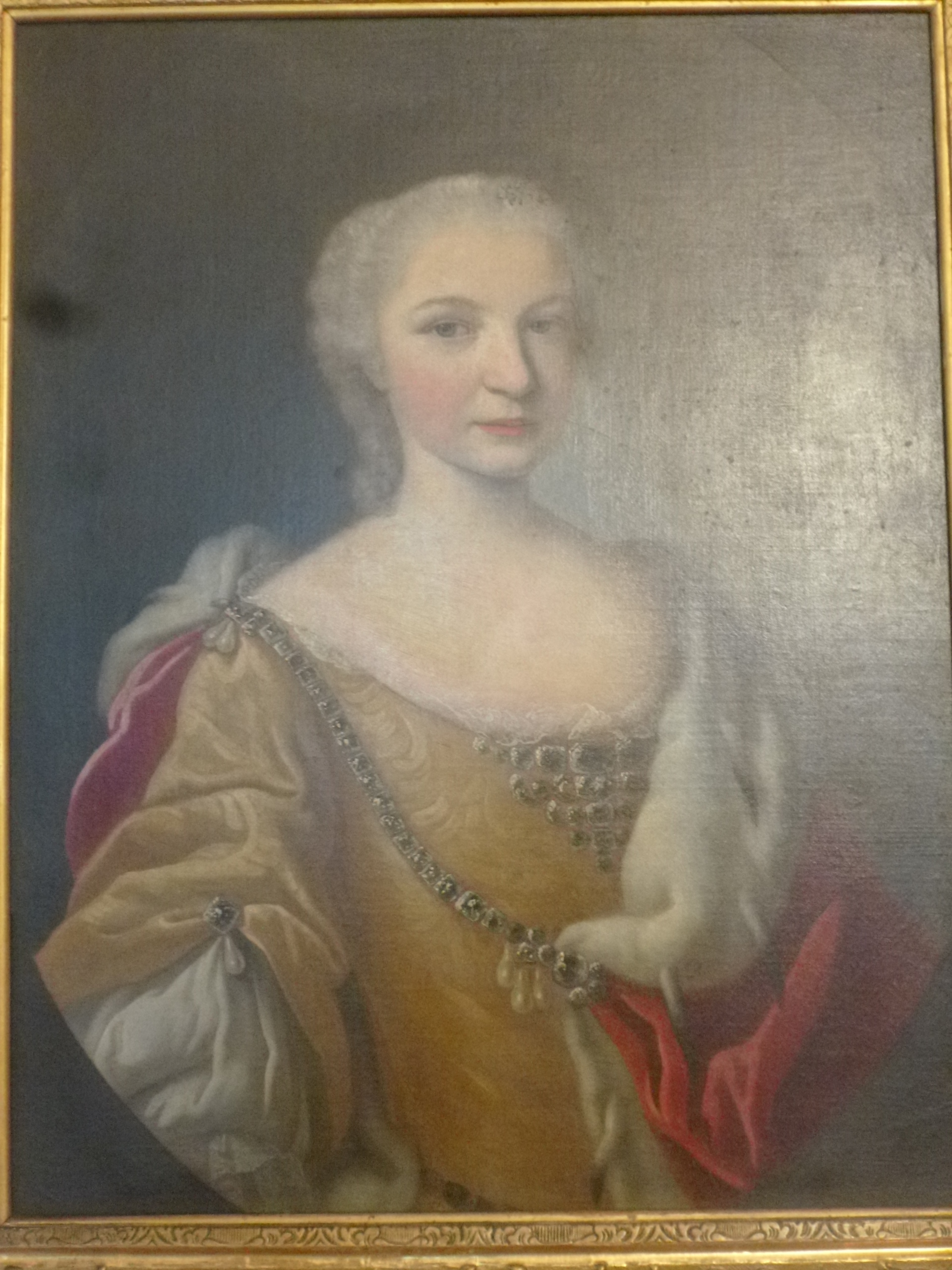
Countess Palatine Ernestine of Sulzbach born 15 May

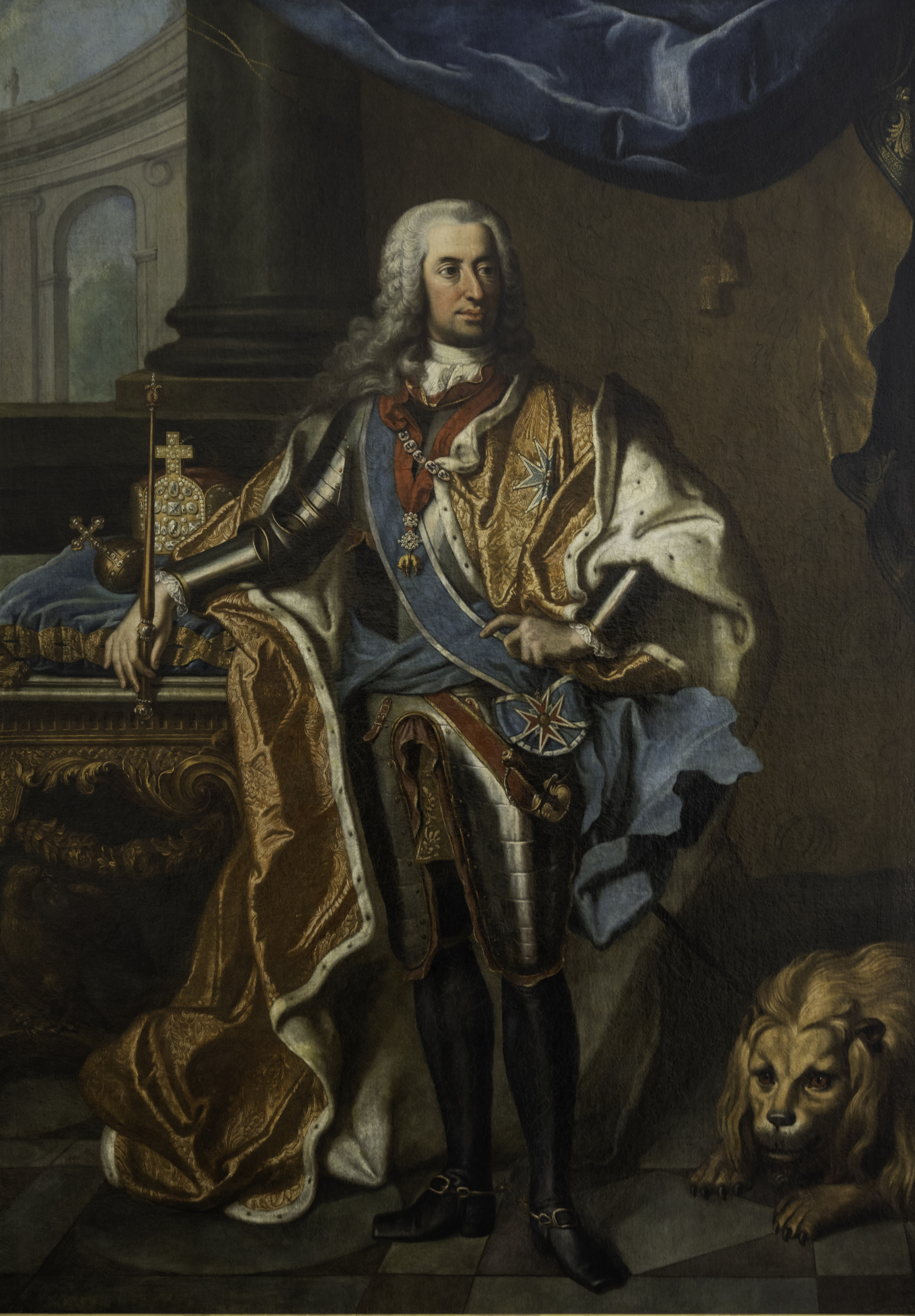
Charles VII, Holy Roman Emperor born 6 August

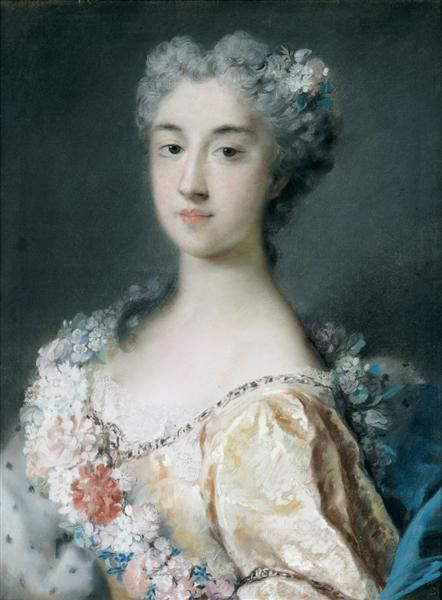
Princess Benedetta d'Este born 18 August

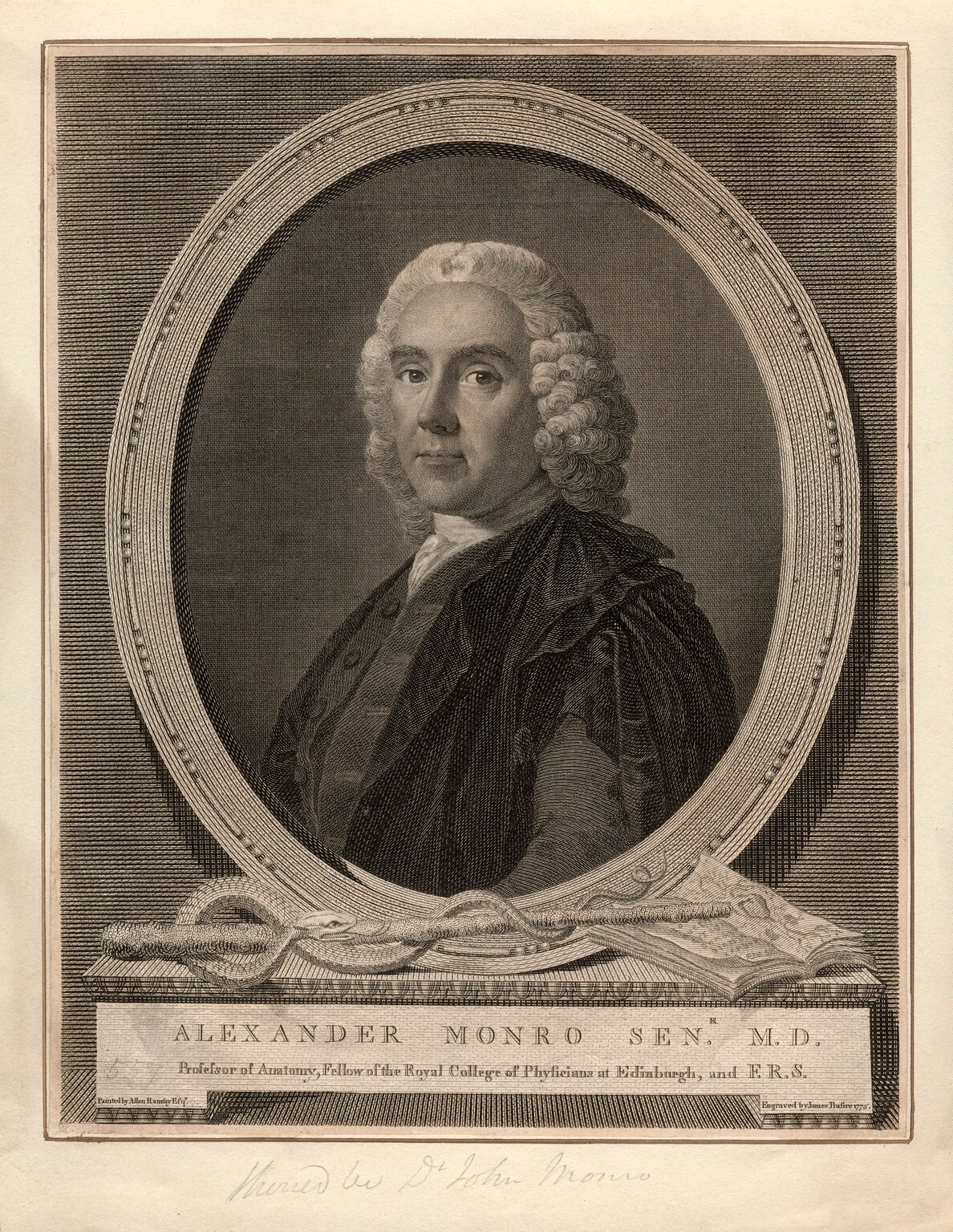
Alexander Monro (primus) born 19 September

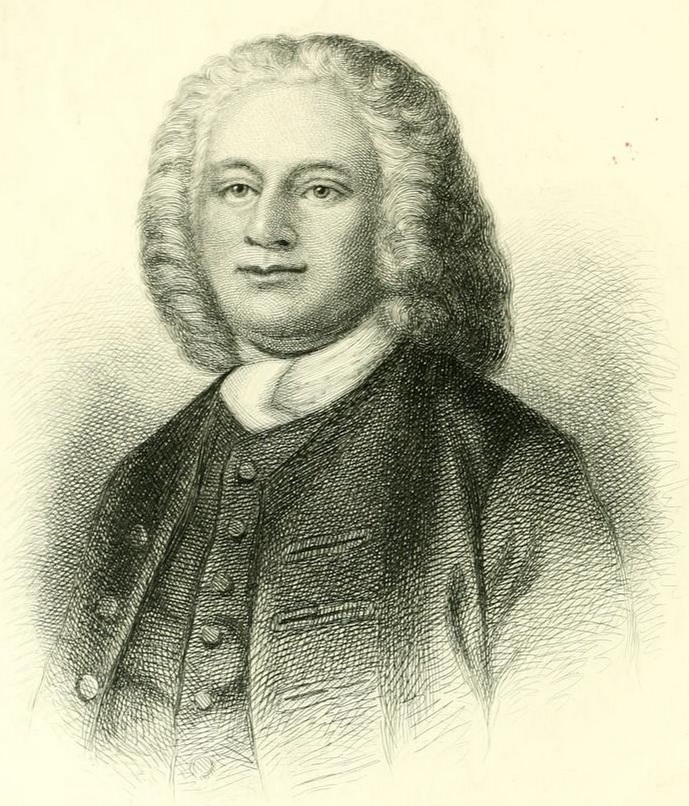
William Smith (judge, born 1697) born 8 October

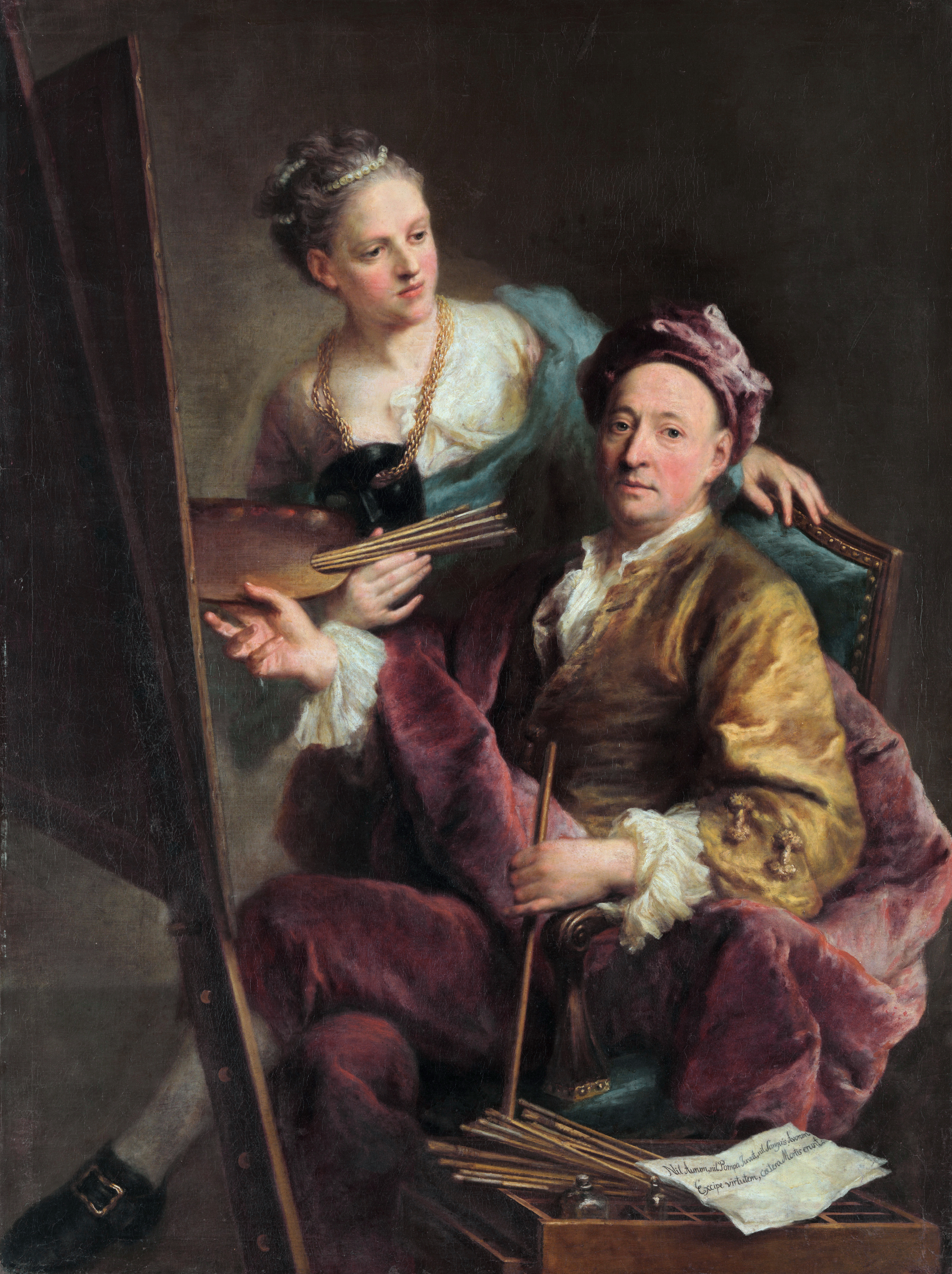
Georg Desmarées born 29 October

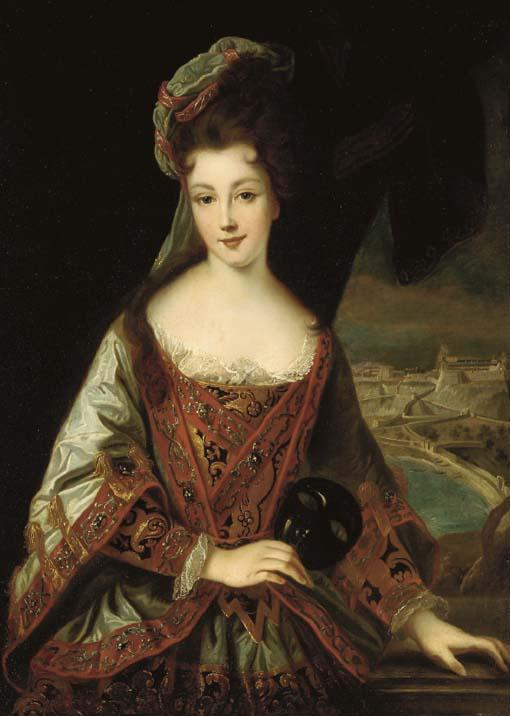
Louise Hippolyte, Princess of Monaco born 10 November

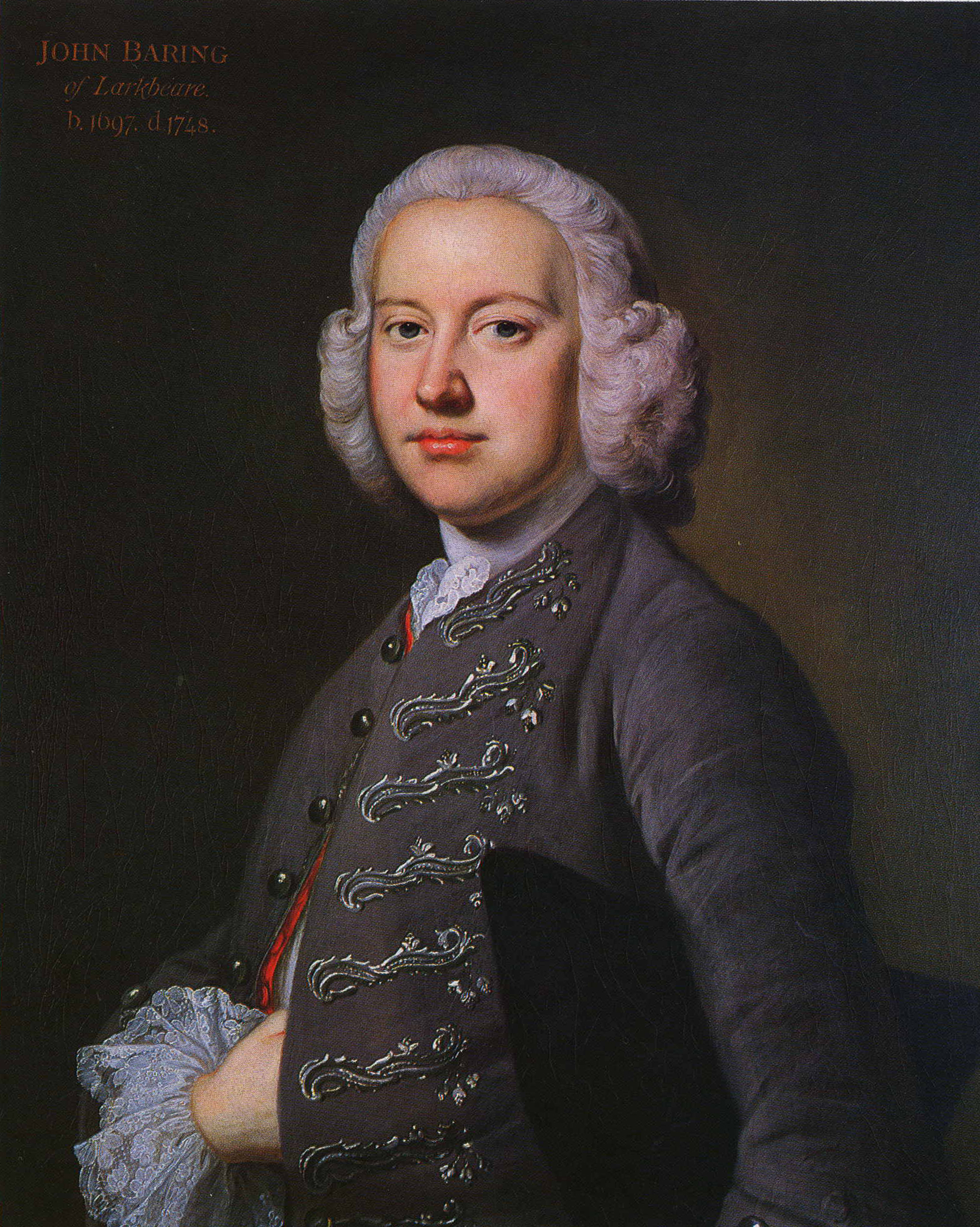
Johann Baring born 15 November

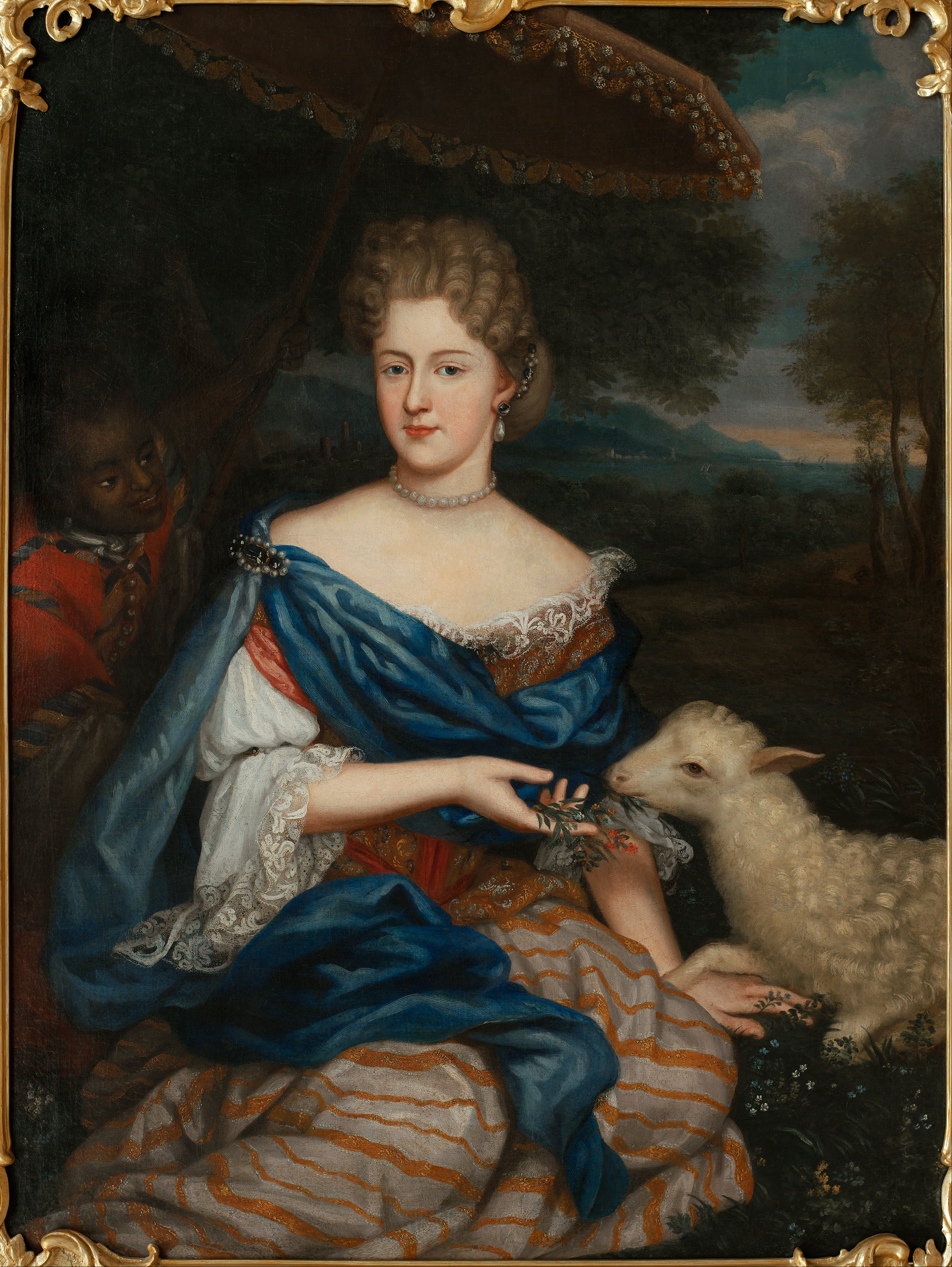
Maria Karolina Sobieska born 25 November

=== January–March ===
- January 1 – Johann Pfeiffer, German violinist (d. 1761)
- January 7
  - Wilhelm August von der Osten, Danish civil servant (d. 1764)
  - Robert Wallace, minister of the Church of Scotland, writer on population (d. 1771)
- January 9 – Gabriel Hanger, 1st Baron Coleraine, English politician (d. 1773)
- January 11 – William Capell, 3rd Earl of Essex, English courtier and diplomat (d. 1743)
- January 13 – Paul-François de Galluccio, marquis de L'Hôpital, French nobleman and ambassador to Russia (d. 1767)
- January 16 – Jules, Prince of Soubise, French nobleman and Prince of Soubise (d. 1724)
- January 17 – Franz Neumayr, German Jesuit preacher (d. 1765)
- January 19 – Thérèse de Couagne, capitalist and slave owner who played an active role in the economy of New France (d. 1764)
- January 22 – Antoine-Martin Chaumont de La Galaizière, French nobleman (d. 1783)
- January 23 – Joseph François Dupleix, Governor-General of French India and rival of Robert Clive (d. 1763)
- January 26 – Sir Hugh Acland, 6th Baronet, British landowner, politician and MP (d. 1728)
- January 30 – Johann Joachim Quantz, German flautist and composer (d. 1773)
- February 1 – Josse Boutmy, composer, organist and harpsichordist of the Austrian Netherlands (d. 1779)
- February 4 – James Franklin, American colonial author (d. 1735)
- February 5 – William Smellie, Scottish obstetrician and medical instructor (d. 1763)
- February 9 – Sir James Johnstone, 3rd Baronet, Scottish baronet and politician (d. 1772)
- February 13 – Knud Leem, Norwegian priest and linguist (d. 1774)
- February 15 – Vito Maria Amico, Italian monk (d. 1752)
- February 24 – Bernhard Siegfried Albinus, German anatomist (d. 1770)
- February 26
  - Giuseppe Pedretti, Italian painter (d. 1778)
  - Edward Thompson, prominent Yorkshire politician (d. 1742)
- February 28
  - Caio Domenico Gallo, Italian historian (d. 1780)
  - Agustín de Montiano y Luyando, Spanish dramatist whose work is linked to Neoclassicism (d. 1764)
- March 6 – Jacques Deschamps, French theologian and priest (d. 1759)
- March 9 – Friederike Caroline Neuber, German actress and theatre director (d. 1760)
- March 12 – Joseph Leblanc dit Le Maigre, Acadian farmer and trader (d. 1772)
- March 20 – József Dravecz, Slovene Roman Catholic priest (d. 1779)
- March 21 – Christian Gottlieb Priber, German immigrant with legal training who emigrated to the British Colonies of North America (d. 1744)
- March 24
  - Louis Constantin de Rohan, French prelate of the House of Rohan (d. 1779)
  - Yunli, Manchu prince of the Qing dynasty (d. 1738)
- March 30
  - Faustina Bordoni, Italian mezzo-soprano (d. 1781)
  - Jan Baptist Xavery, Flemish sculptor principally active in the Dutch Republic (d. 1742)

=== April–June ===
- April 2
  - Gaetano Casanova, Italian actor and ballet dancer (d. 1733)
  - Sauveur François Morand, French surgeon (d. 1773)
- April 12 – Anton Pichler, Tyrolean goldsmith and artist of engraved gems (d. 1779)
- April 16 – Johann Gottlieb Görner, German composer and organist (d. 1778)
- April 23 – George Anson, 1st Baron Anson, British admiral (d. 1762)
- April 26 – Adam Falckenhagen, German lutenist and composer (d. 1754)
- May 2 – Michael Fabritius, Danish merchant (d. 1746)
- May 5 – Henricus Boelen, American silversmith in New York City (d. 1755)
- May 10 – Jean-Marie Leclair, French violinist (d. 1764)
- May 15 – Countess Palatine Ernestine of Sulzbach, wife of Landgrave William II (d. 1775)
- May 16 – John Berkeley, 5th Baron Berkeley of Stratton, British politician (d. 1773)
- May 20 – Francesco Scipione Maria Borghese, Italian cardinal from the Borghese family (d. 1759)
- May 28 – Frederick Bernard, Count Palatine of Gelnhausen (d. 1739)
- June 2 – Thomas Whincop, English compiler of theatrical history (d. 1730)
- June 4 – Jacob Emden, German rabbi and talmudist who championed Orthodox Judaism (d. 1776)
- June 9 – Augustus Louis, Prince of Anhalt-Köthen, German prince of the House of Ascania (d. 1755)
- June 10 – Johann Caspar Barthel, German canon lawyer (d. 1771)
- June 11 – Francesco Antonio Vallotti, Italian composer (d. 1780)
- June 24 – Heinrich Joseph Johann of Auersperg, fourth Prince of Auersperg (d. 1783)

=== July–September ===
- July 27 – Isaac Maddox, Anglican clergyman (d. 1759)
- July 31 – Pietro Paolo Vasta, Italian painter (d. 1760)
- August 4 – Susanna Wright, colonial English American poet (d. 1784)
- August 6
  - Nicola Salvi, Italian architect (d. 1751)
  - Charles VII, Holy Roman Emperor from 1742 to 1745 (d. 1745)
- August 10 – Alexander Kurakin, statesman and diplomat (d. 1749)
- August 17 – Alexander Brodie, Scottish politician (d. 1754)
- August 18 – Princess Benedetta d'Este, noblewoman and princess of the Duchy of Modena and Reggio (d. 1777)
- August 19 – Richard Wingfield, 1st Viscount Powerscourt, Irish politician and peer (d. 1751)
- August 26 – Giovanni Battista Tagliasacchi, Italian painter of the late-Baroque period (d. 1737)
- August 28 – Armande de La Tour d'Auvergne, French noblewoman and Princess of Epinoy by marriage (d. 1717)
- August 30 – Henry Flitcroft, major English architect in the second generation of Palladianism (d. 1769)
- September 2 – Thomas Deacon, English non-juror bishop (d. 1753)
- September 6 – James Foster, English Baptist minister (d. 1753)
- September 16 – St George Caulfeild, Lord Chief Justice of Ireland (d. 1778)
- September 17 – John Gardner, American judge (d. 1764)
- September 18 – Cornelius Heinrich Dretzel, German organist and composer (bapt. 1697–1775) (d. 1775)
- September 19 – Alexander Monro, Scottish surgeon and anatomist (d. 1767)
- September 25 – Francis Josias, Duke of Saxe-Coburg-Saalfeld (d. 1764)
- September 27 – Franz Ernst Brückmann, German mineralogist born at Mariental (d. 1753)

=== October–December ===
- October 6 – Sir Robert Austen, 4th Baronet, British politician (d. 1743)
- October 8
  - Augustine Françoise de Choiseul, French aristocrat (d. 1728)
  - William Smith, American lawyer and jurist (d. 1769)
- October 9 – Pierre Philibert de Blancheton, French politician and music patron and collector (d. 1756)
- October 15 – Leopold Innocenty Nepomucen Polzer, Polish lawyer (d. 1753)
- October 16
  - Nicholas Amhurst, English poet and political writer (d. 1742)
  - Marie Anne de Bourbon, Superintendent of the Household to the French queen Marie Leszczyńska (d. 1741)
- October 18
  - Canaletto, Italian painter from the Republic of Venice (d. 1768)
  - Luigi Maria Torregiani, Italian Cardinal (d. 1777)
- October 19 – Claude-Pierre Goujet, French abbé and littérateur (d. 1767)
- October 22 – Mary Seymour, Duchess of Somerset (d. 1768)
- October 25 – Bartolomeo Ruspoli, Cardinal of the Roman Catholic Church (d. 1741)
- October 26 – John Peter Zenger, German printer and journalist in New York City (d. 1746)
- October 28 – Johann Gottfried Auerbach, Austrian painter and etcher (d. 1753)
- October 29 – Georg Desmarées, Swedish-born German portrait painter (d. 1776)
- October 31 – Johann Christian Fiedler, German portrait painter (d. 1765)
- November 2 – James Douglas, 3rd Marquess of Queensberry, Scottish noble (d. 1715)
- November 6 – Euseby Isham, English academic administrator at the University of Oxford (d. 1755)
- November 8 – Giovanni Lami, Italian jurist (d. 1770)
- November 9 – August Aleksander Czartoryski, member of the Polish nobility (Lang-pl (d. 1782)
- November 10
  - Louise Hippolyte, Princess of Monaco (d. 1731)
  - William Hogarth, English artist (d. 1764)
- November 13 – Lord William Manners, English nobleman, Whig politician and MP (d. 1772)
- November 15 – Johann Baring, German merchant (d. 1748)
- November 17 – René-Prosper Tassin, French historian (d. 1777)
- November 21 – Mateša Antun Kuhačević, Croatian poet and politician from Senj (d. 1772)
- November 23 – John Gill, English Baptist pastor (d. 1771)
- November 25
  - Maria Karolina Sobieska (d. 1740)
  - Gerhard Tersteegen, German Reformed religious writer and hymnist (d. 1769)
- November 30 – Johann Albrecht Korff, Russian diplomat (d. 1766)
- December 4 – Nicolas-Charles-Joseph Trublet, French churchman (canon of Saint-Malo) and moralist (d. 1770)
- December 6 – Carlo Arrigoni, Italian composer and musician active in several countries (d. 1744)
- December 7 – Peter August, Duke of Schleswig-Holstein-Sonderburg-Beck (d. 1775)
- December 11
  - Sakaki Hyakusen, Japanese painter in the nanga style (d. 1752)
  - Pyotr Saltykov (d. 1772)
- December 14 – Soloman Sprecher von Bernegg, Austrian military commander (d. 1758)
- December 18 – Marcantonio Dal Re, Italian engraver and publisher (d. 1766)
- December 21
  - Charles Bennet, 2nd Earl of Tankerville, British peer and politician (d. 1753)
  - Georg Erhard Hamberger, German professor of medicine (d. 1755)
- December 27 – Sollom Emlyn, Irish legal writer (d. 1754)

1698

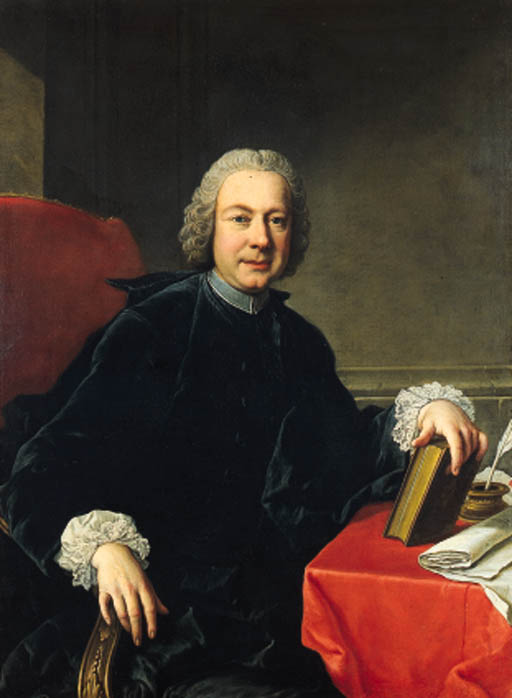
Pietro Metastasio born 3 January

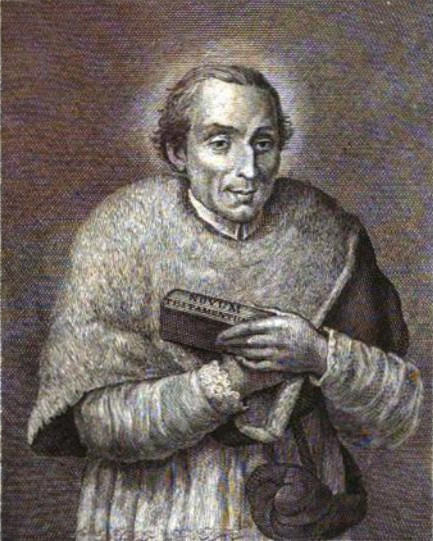
Giovanni Battista de' Rossi born 22 February

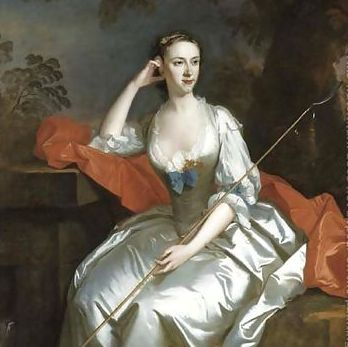
Lady Jane Douglas born 17 March

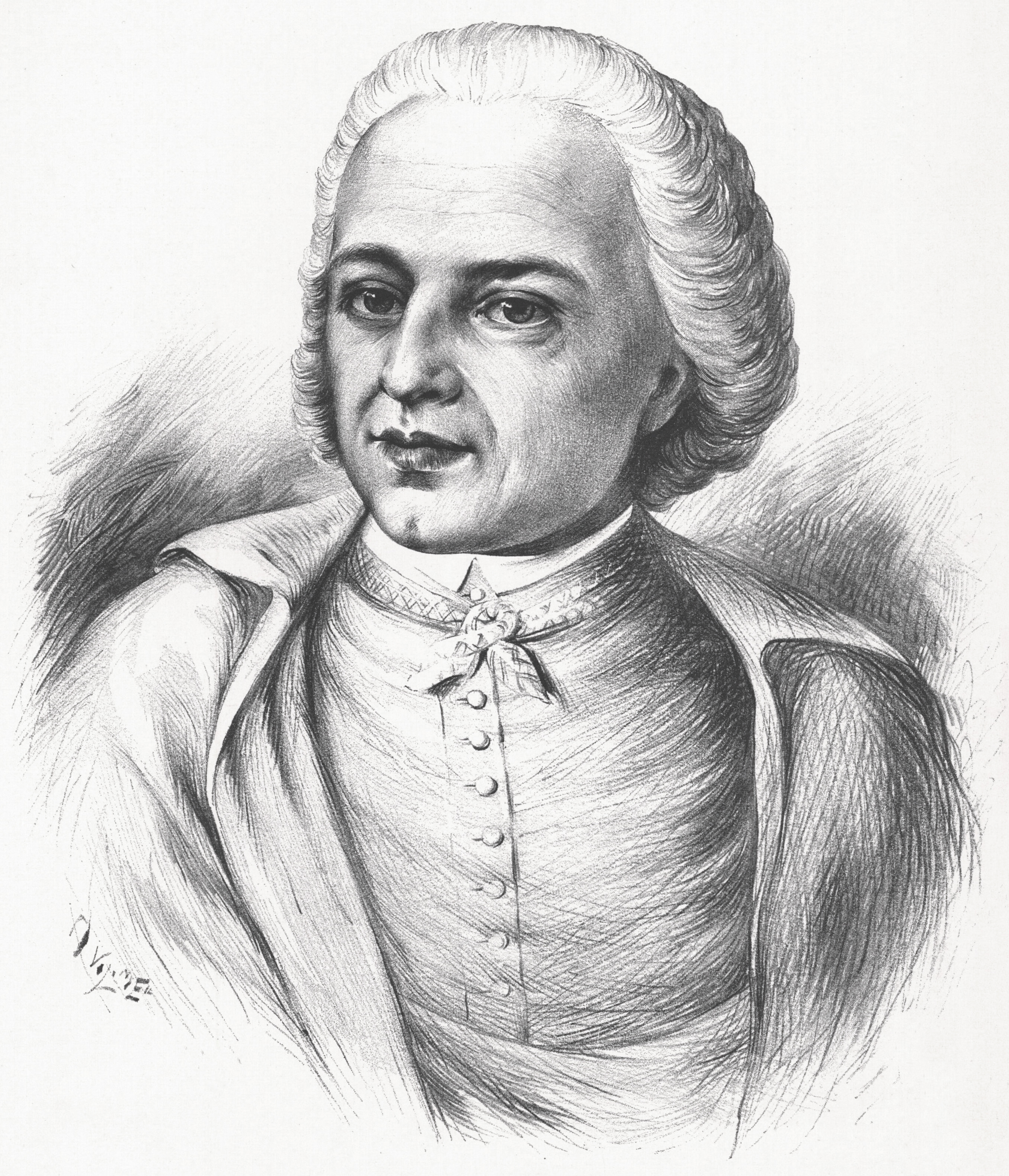
Prokop Diviš born 26 March

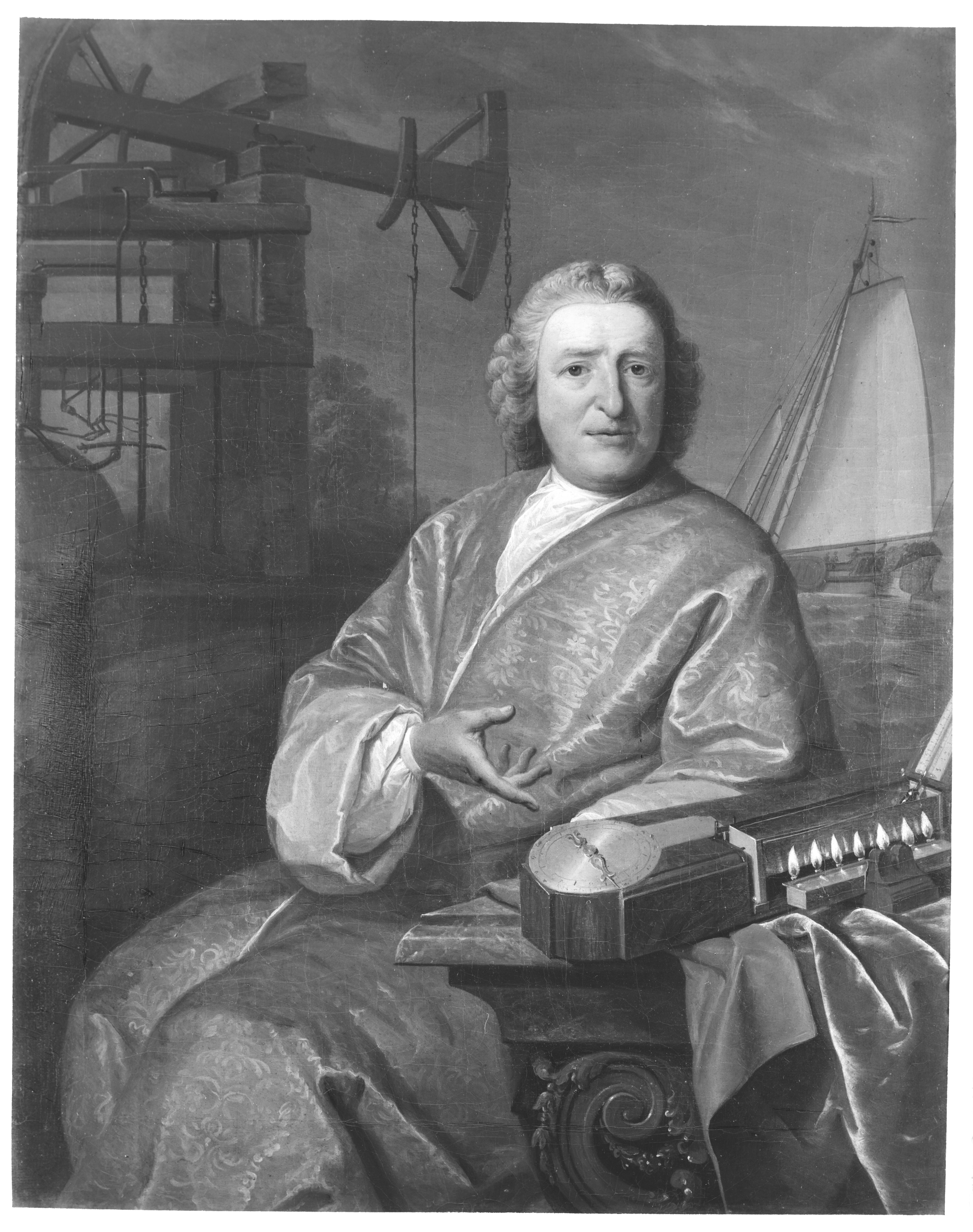
Steven Hoogendijk born 1 April

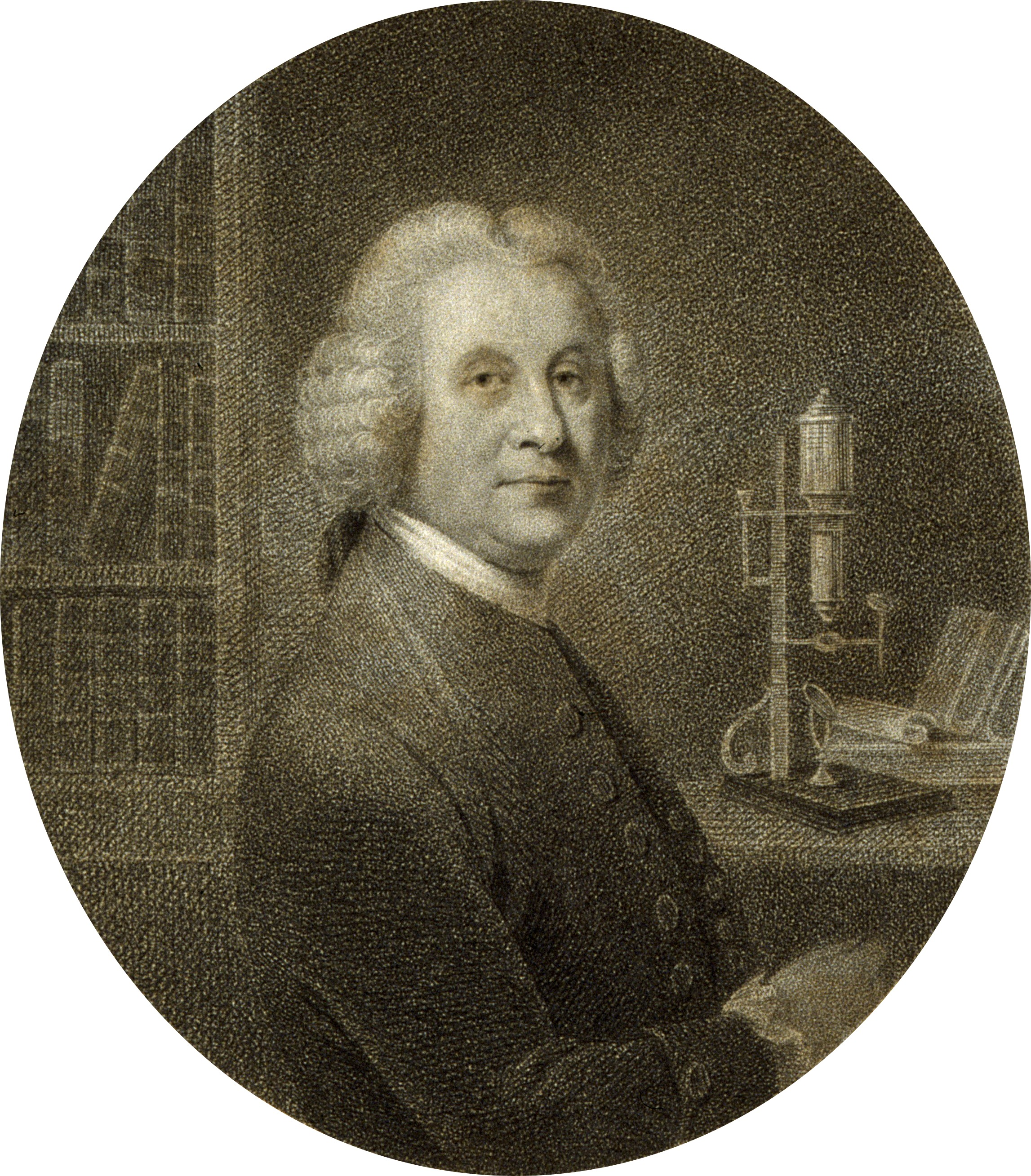
Henry Baker (naturalist) born 8 May

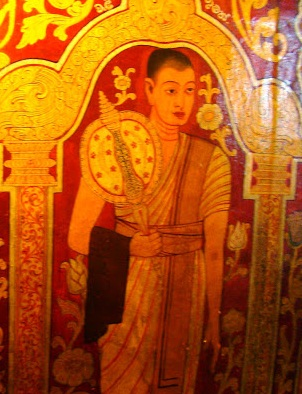
Weliwita Sri Saranankara Thero born 19 June

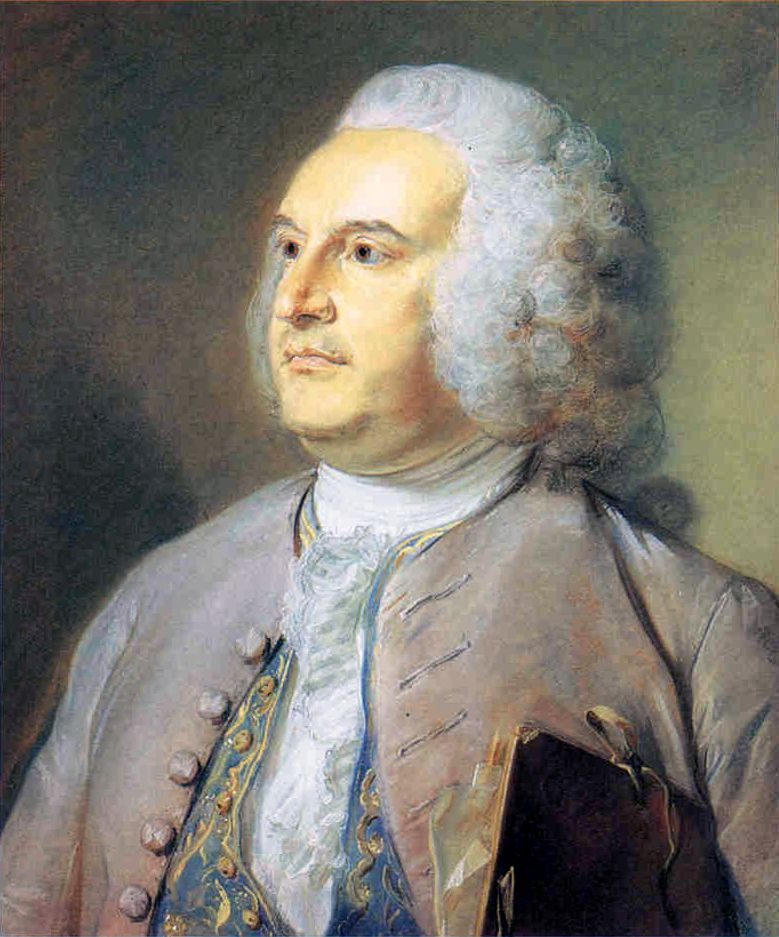
Jean-Michel Chevotet born 11 July

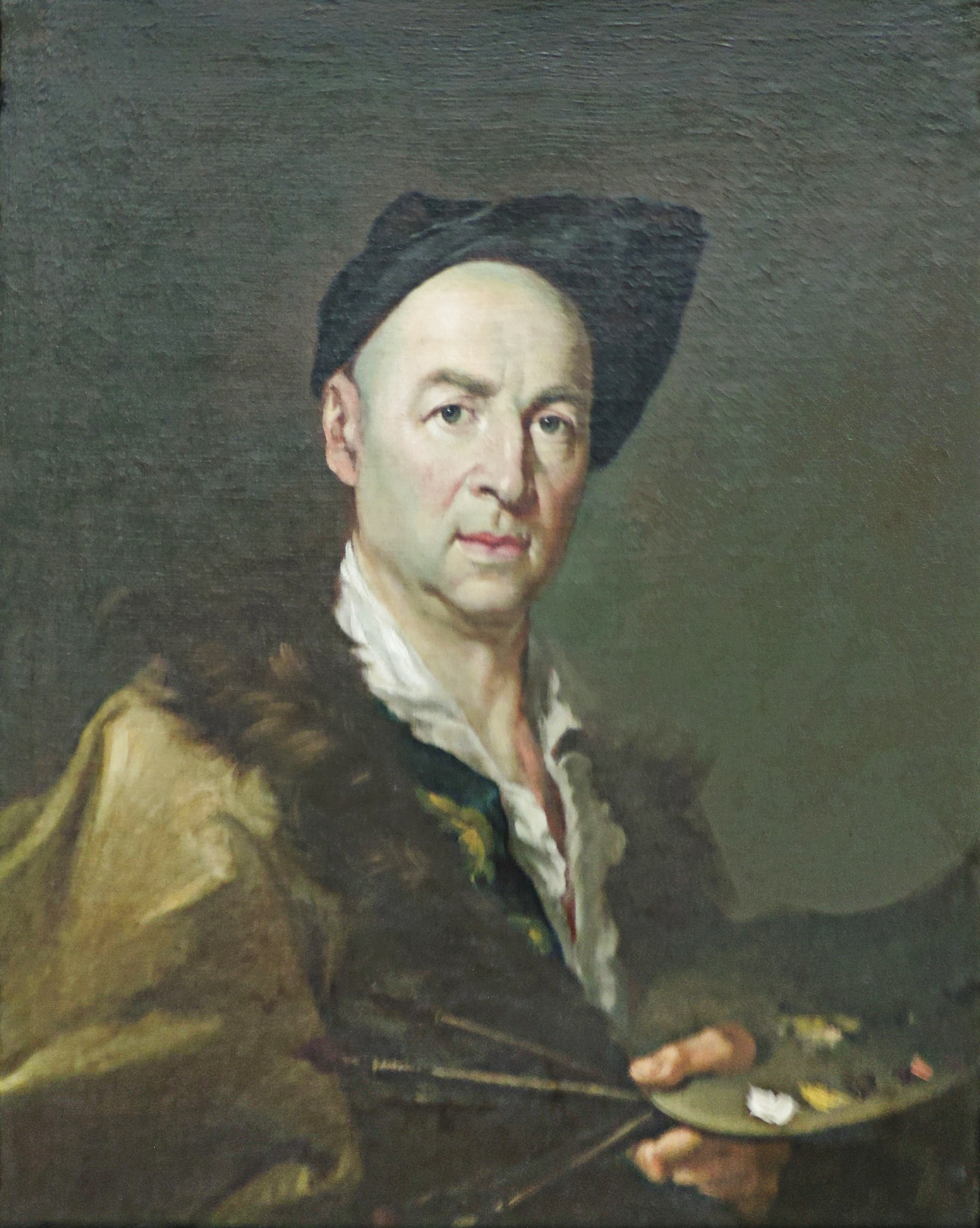
Giacomo Ceruti born 13 October

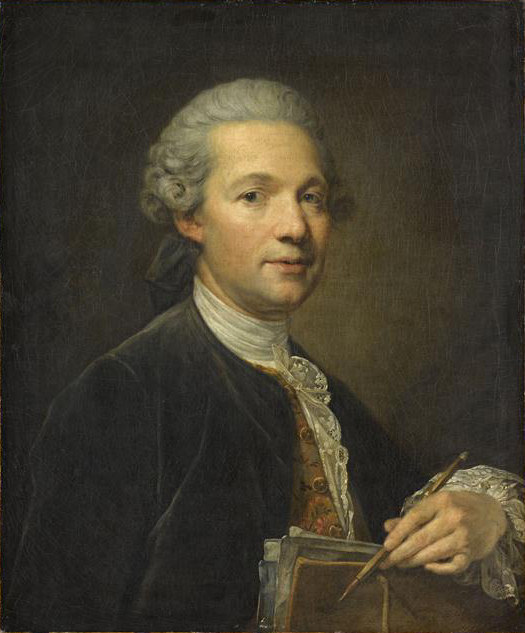
Ange-Jacques Gabriel born 23 October

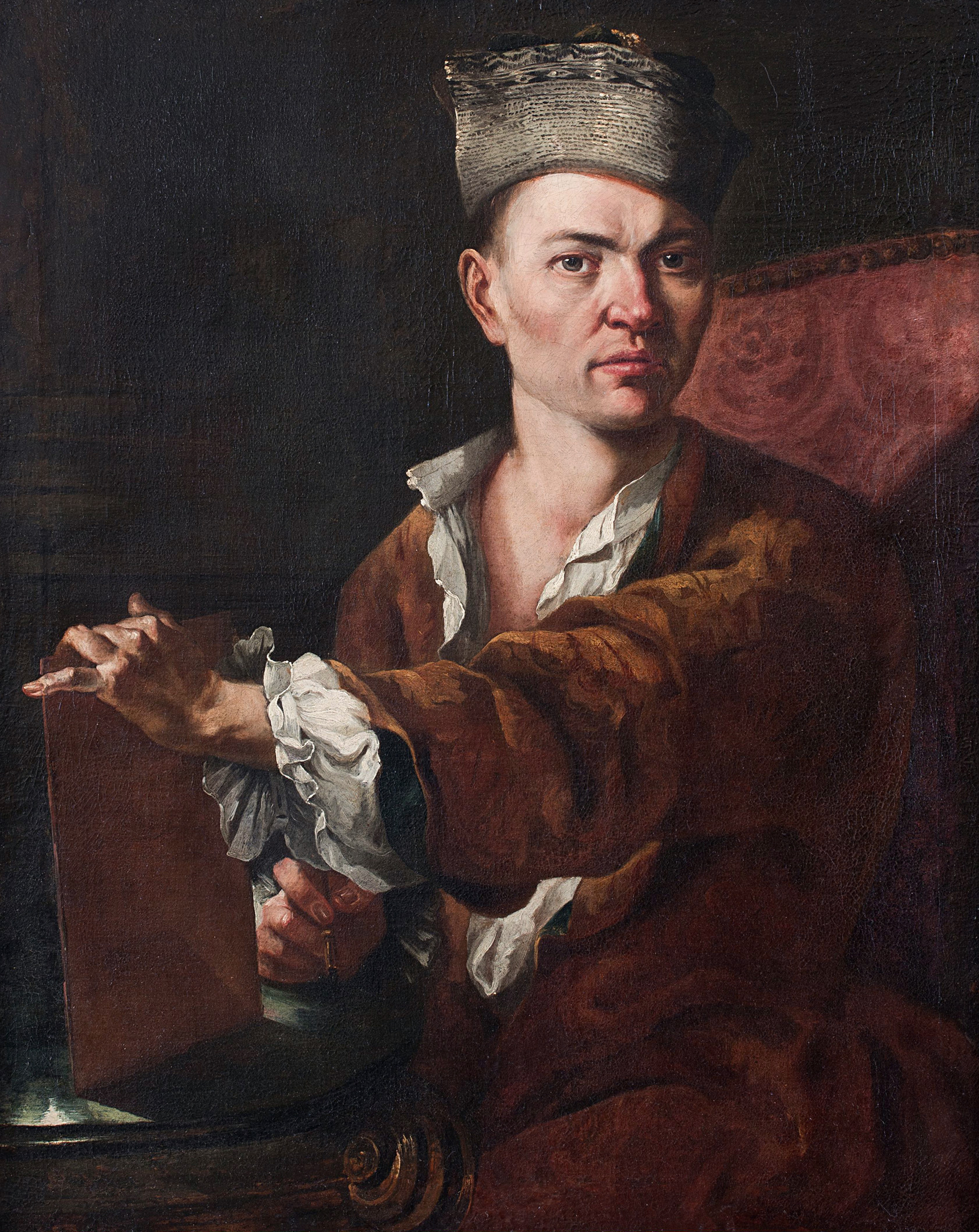
Paul Troger born 30 October

=== January–March ===
- January 1 – Leonardo VII Tocco, Italian noble, the Prince of Montemiletto and the titular Prince of Achaea (d. 1776)
- January 3 – Metastasio, (b. Pietro Antonio Domenico Trapassi), Italian poet and opera librettist (d. 1782)
- January 7 – Thomas Southwell, 2nd Baron Southwell, Irish peer, politician and freemason (d. 1766)
- January 21 – Auguste Louise of Württemberg-Oels, Duchess of Württemberg-Oels by birth and by marriage Duchess of Saxe-Weissenfels-Barby (d. 1739)
- February 4 – Heinrich August de la Motte Fouqué, Prussian Lieutenant general and General der Infanterie and a confidant of King Frederick the Great (d. 1774)
- February 5 – Germain-François Poullain de Saint-Foix, 18th-century French writer and playwright (d. 1776)
- February 7 – Nicolas Sarrabat, French mathematician and scientist (d. 1739)
- February 16
  - Pierre Bouguer, French mathematician, geophysicist, geodesist, and astronomer (d. 1758)
  - Johann Elias Ridinger, German painter (d. 1767)
- February 19 – William FitzRoy, 3rd Duke of Cleveland, English nobleman (d. 1774)
- February 20
  - Gerard Arnout Hasselaer, burgomaster and counsellor of the city of Amsterdam (d. 1766)
  - Bernardo Tanucci, Italian statesman (d. 1783)
- February 22 – Giovanni Battista de' Rossi, Italian Roman Catholic priest (d. 1764)
- February 23 – Thomas Bladen, colonial governor in North America and British MP (d. 1780)
- February 28 – Sigismund von Schrattenbach, Prince-Archbishop of Salzburg (d. 1771)
- March 6 – Johannes Alberti, Dutch theologian (d. 1762)
- March 17 – Lady Jane Douglas, Scottish noblewoman (d. 1753)
- March 26 – Václav Prokop Diviš, Czech priest, scientist and inventor (d. 1765)

=== April–June ===
- April 1 – Steven Hoogendijk, Rotterdam watch and instrument maker and physicist (d. 1788)
- April 2 – Henry Edgar, Scottish Episcopal minister, Bishop of Fife from 1762 to 1765 (d. 1765)
- April 5 – Anne Hamilton, 2nd Countess of Ruglen, Scottish noblewoman (d. 1748)
- April 19 – Daniel Gerdes, German Calvinist theologian and historian (d. 1765)
- April 28 – John Phillipson, British Navy administrator, commissioner, MP for over 20 years (d. 1756)
- May 1 – Francesco Robba, Italian sculptor (d. 1757)
- May 8 – Henry Baker, British naturalist (d. 1774)
- May 10
  - Cuthbert Ellison, British Army officer and MP for Shaftesbury (d. 1785)
  - François Parfaict, 18th-century French theatre historian (d. 1753)
- May 11 – Pierre Contant d'Ivry, French architect and designer (d. 1777)
- May 17
  - Gio Nicola Buhagiar, Maltese painter (d. 1752)
  - Sir John Major, 1st Baronet, British merchant (d. 1781)
- May 22 – Lord William Beauclerk, British army officer and politician (d. 1733)
- May 24 – John, Count Palatine of Gelnhausen (d. 1780)
- June 2 – Henry Miles, English Dissenting minister, scientific writer, Fellow of the Royal Society (d. 1763)
- June 15 – George Browne, Irish soldier of fortune in Russian service (d. 1792)
- June 19
  - Aoki Konyō, Confucian scholar (d. 1769)
  - Weliwita Sri Saranankara Thero, Last Sangharaja of Sri Lanka (d. 1778)
- June 22 – Charles-Hugues Le Febvre de Saint-Marc, 18th-century French playwright and homme de lettres (d. 1769)
- June 23 – Lord Nassau Powlett, English army officer and MP (d. 1741)

=== July–September ===
- July 8 – Nicolò Maria Antonelli, Italian Cardinal in the Roman Catholic Church (d. 1767)
- July 11
  - Jean-Michel Chevotet, French architect (d. 1772)
  - George Turnbull, Scottish philosopher (d. 1748)
- July 17 – Pierre Louis Moreau de Maupertuis, French mathematician (d. 1759)
- July 19
  - Johann Jakob Bodmer, Swiss author (d. 1783)
  - John Clavering, English MP and Groom of the Bedchamber at the Court of George II (d. 1762)
- July 24 – František Jiránek, Czech (Bohemian) Baroque composer (d. 1778)
- August 18 – Samuel Klingenstierna, Swedish mathematician and scientist (d. 1765)
- August 20 – Louis Fornel, Canadian merchant (d. 1745)
- August 24 – Erik Pontoppidan, Danish author (d. 1764)
- August 29
  - Richard Pearsall, English Congregationalist minister, friend of Philip Doddridge (d. 1762)
  - Jacob Vernet, prominent theologian in Geneva (d. 1789)
- September 6 – Jean Thurel, French soldier (d. 1807)
- September 8
  - François Francoeur, French composer and violinist (d. 1787)
  - Friederike Charlotte of Hesse-Darmstadt, princess of Hesse-Darmstadt and through her marriage a princess of Hesse-Kassel (d. 1777)
- September 14 – Charles François de Cisternay du Fay, French chemist and superintendent of the Jardin du Roi (d. 1739)
- September 15 – Pier Francesco Guala, Italian painter (d. 1757)
- September 23 – Lewis Morris, colonial American judge (d. 1762)
- September 26 – William Cavendish, 3rd Duke of Devonshire, British nobleman, Whig politician and MP (d. 1755)
- September 28 – Joachim Christian von Tresckow, Prussian Lieutenant General (d. 1762)

=== October–December ===
- October 6 – François-Bernard Lépicié, 18th-century French engraver (d. 1755)
- October 7 – Henry Madin, French composer at the Chapelle royale (d. 1748)
- October 12 – Jean Paul Timoléon de Cossé-Brissac, Marshal of France (d. 1784)
- October 13 – Giacomo Ceruti, Italian late Baroque painter (d. 1767)
- October 23
  - Ange-Jacques Gabriel, principal architect of King Louis XV of France (d. 1782)
  - John Jortin, English church historian (d. 1770)
- October 30
  - Peter Thompson, English merchant (d. 1770)
  - Paul Troger, Austrian painter (d. 1762)
- November 4 – Caleb Fleming, English dissenting minister and Polemicist (d. 1779)
- November 6 – Sir Alexander Lauder, 4th Baronet (d. 1730)
- November 8 – Alberico Archinto, Italian cardinal and papal diplomat (d. 1758)
- November 10 – Maria Taylor Byrd, colonial woman who managed her and her husband William Byrd II's Westover Plantation when he was absent (d. 1771)
- November 22 – Pierre de Rigaud, marquis de Vaudreuil-Cavagnial, Canadian-born colonial governor of French Canada in North America (d. 1778)
- November 23 – Jacob Johann Köhler, Estonian printer who published the first Estonian-language Bible in 1739 (d. 1757)
- November 24 – Charles Douglas, 3rd Duke of Queensberry, Scottish nobleman, extensive landowner, Privy Counsellor, Vice Admiral of Scotland (d. 1778)
- November 28 – Charlotta Frölich, Swedish agronomist (d. 1770)
- December 2 – Oliver Legipont, German Benedictine bibliographer (d. 1758)
- December 6 – Anthony Mooyart, acting Governor of Ceylon during the Dutch period in Ceylon (d. 1767)
- December 9 – Mark Hiddesley, Anglican churchman (d. 1773)
- December 20 – Paul Fourdrinier, English engraver (d. 1758)
- December 21 – Philip Wharton, 1st Duke of Wharton, powerful Jacobite politician (d. 1731)
- December 24 – William Warburton, English critic and Bishop of Gloucester (d. 1779)
- December 25 – Jacobus Houbraken, Dutch engraver and the son of the artist and biographer Arnold Houbraken (d. 1780)
- December 26 – Filippo della Valle, Italian late-Baroque or early Neoclassic sculptor (d. 1768)
- December 27 – Vlaho Kabužić, Ragusan nobleman and diplomat (d. 1750)
- date unknown
  - Bernard Forest de Bélidor, French engineer (d. 1761)
  - William Moraley, English-American indentured servant and autobiographer, a primary source for life in the Province of Pennsylvania (d. 1762)
  - Baal Shem Tov, Polish rabbi and founder of the Hasidic movement of Judaism.

1699

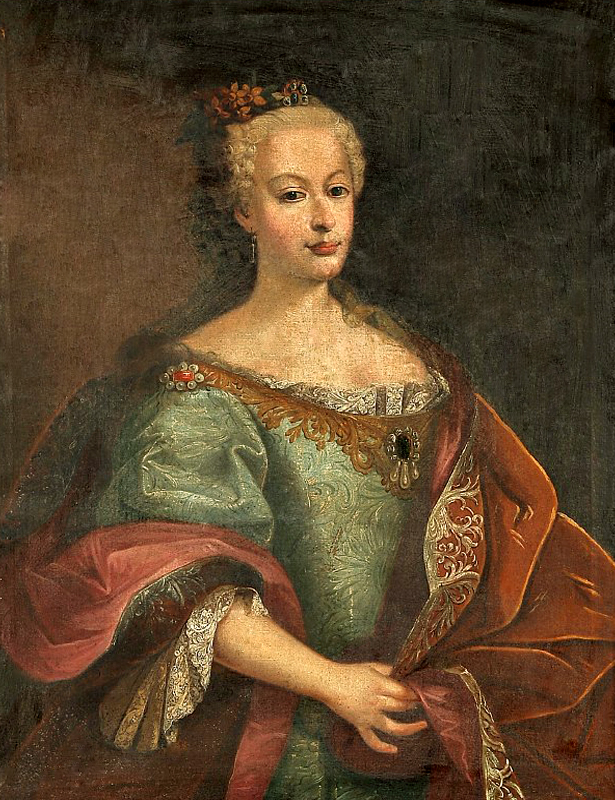
Infanta Francisca Josefa of Portugal born 30 January

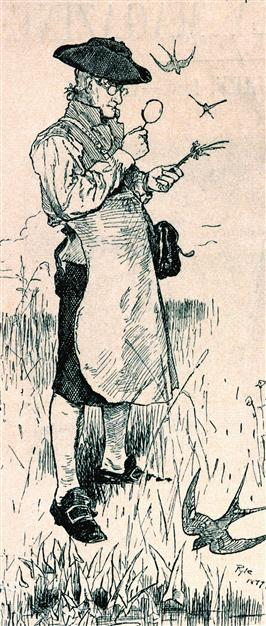
John Bartram born 23 March

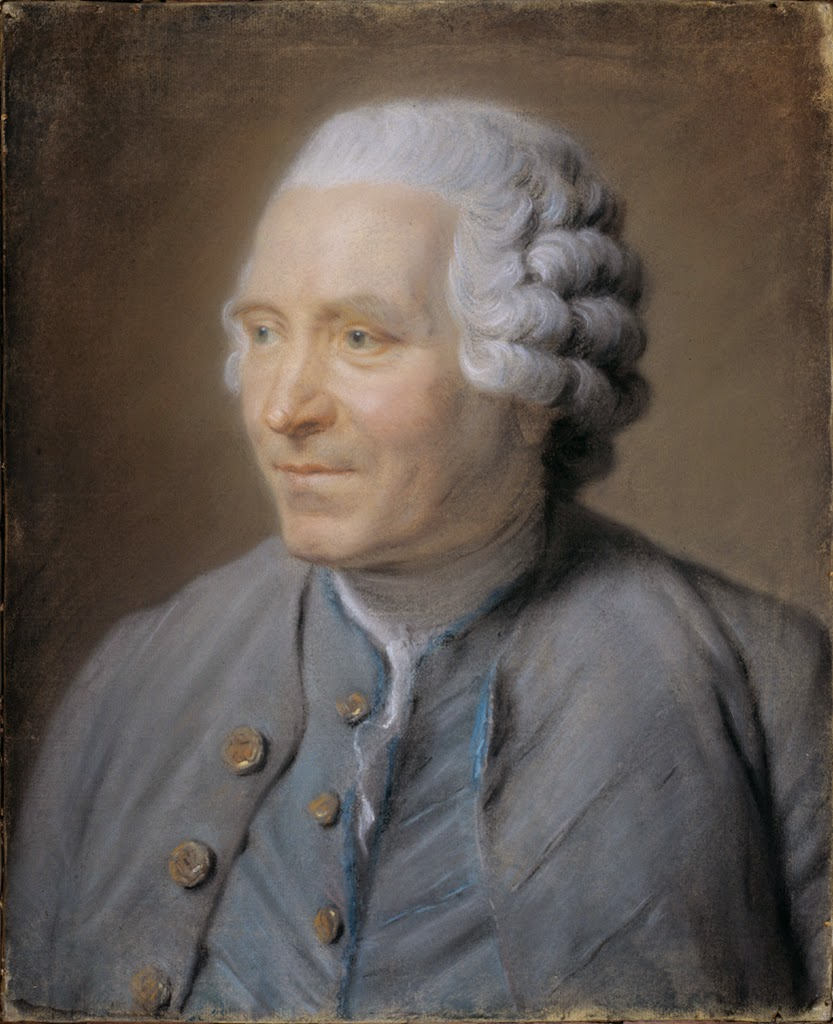
Hubert-François Gravelot born 26 March

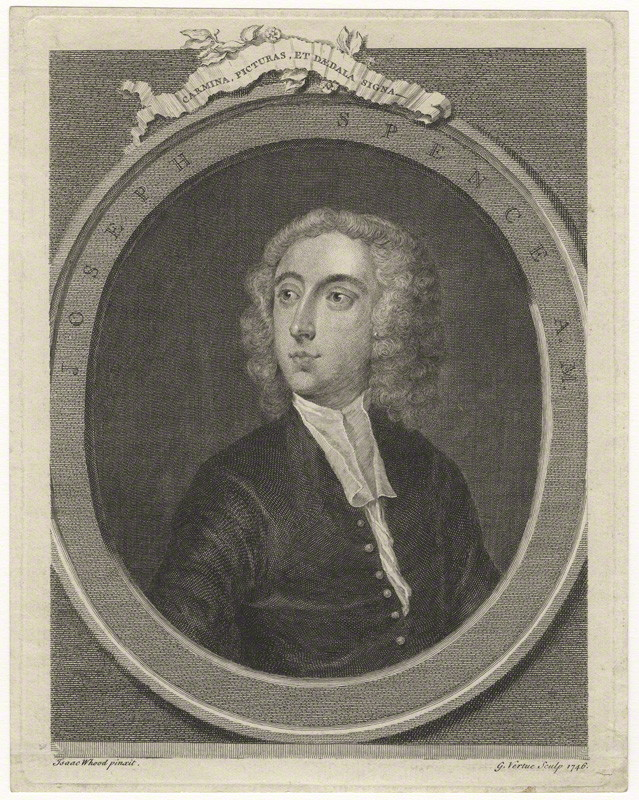
Joseph Spence (author) born 28 April

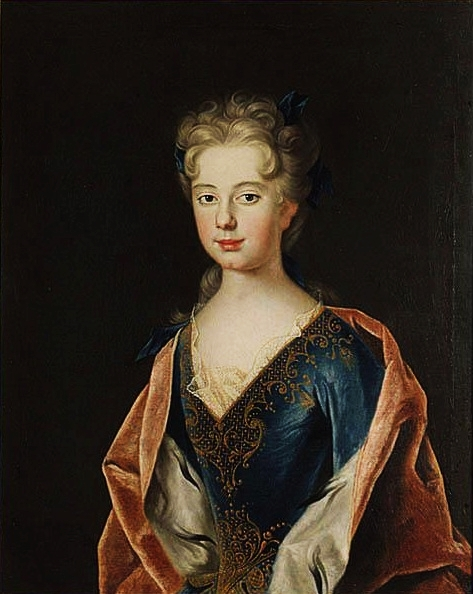
Anna Leszczyńska (1699–1717) born 25 May

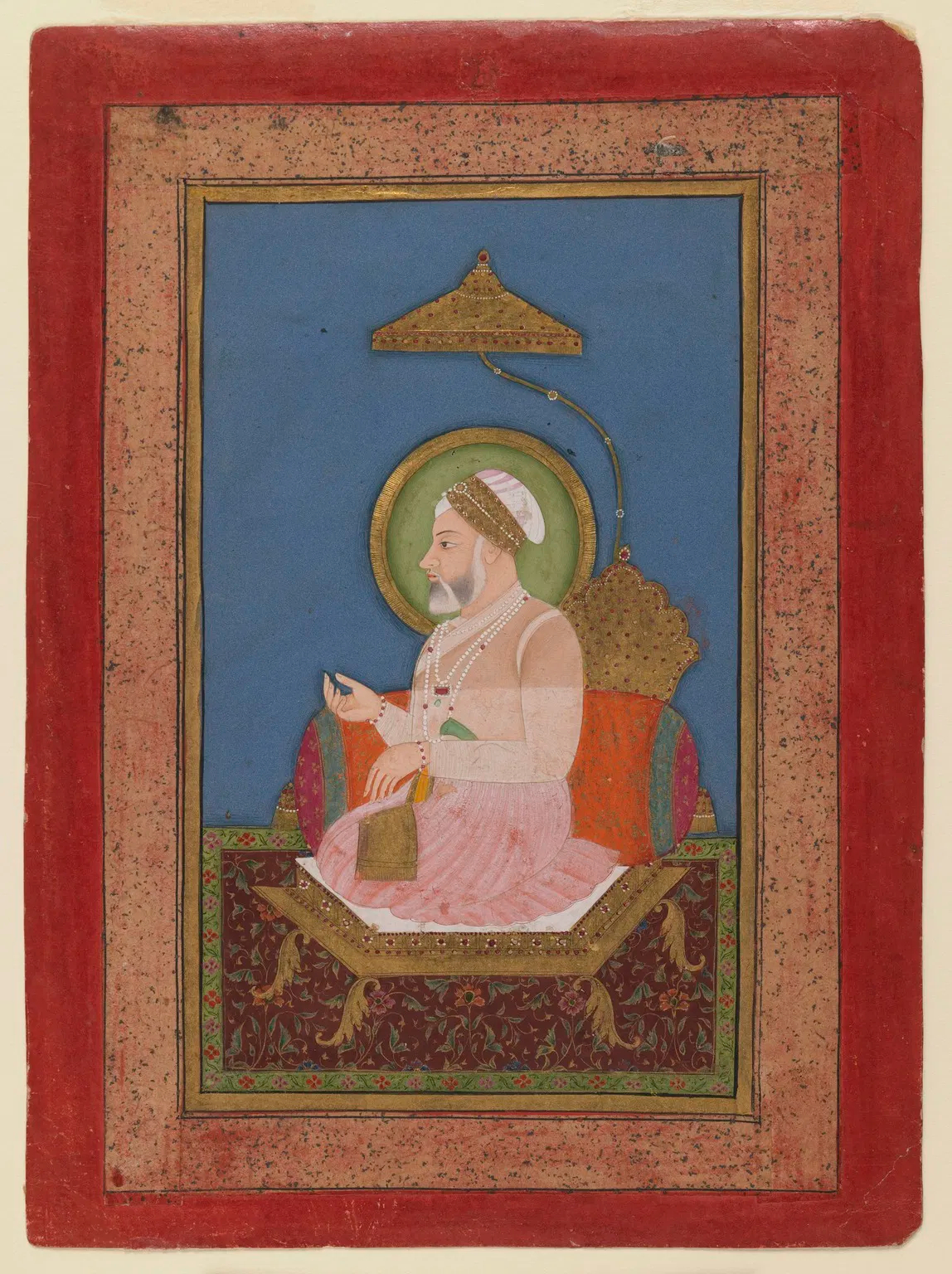
Alamgir II born 6 June

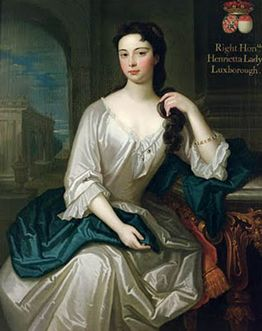
Henrietta Knight, Lady Luxborough born 15 July

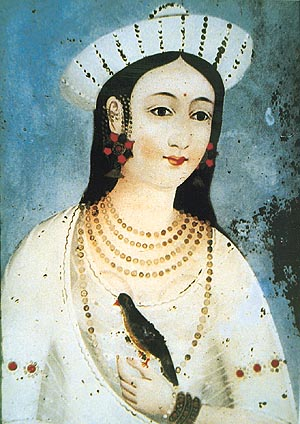
Mastani born 29 August

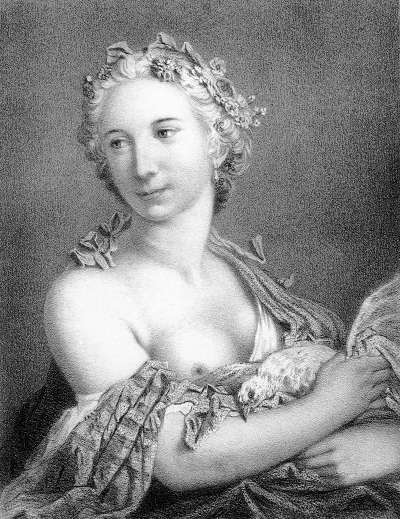
Jeanne Quinault born 13 October

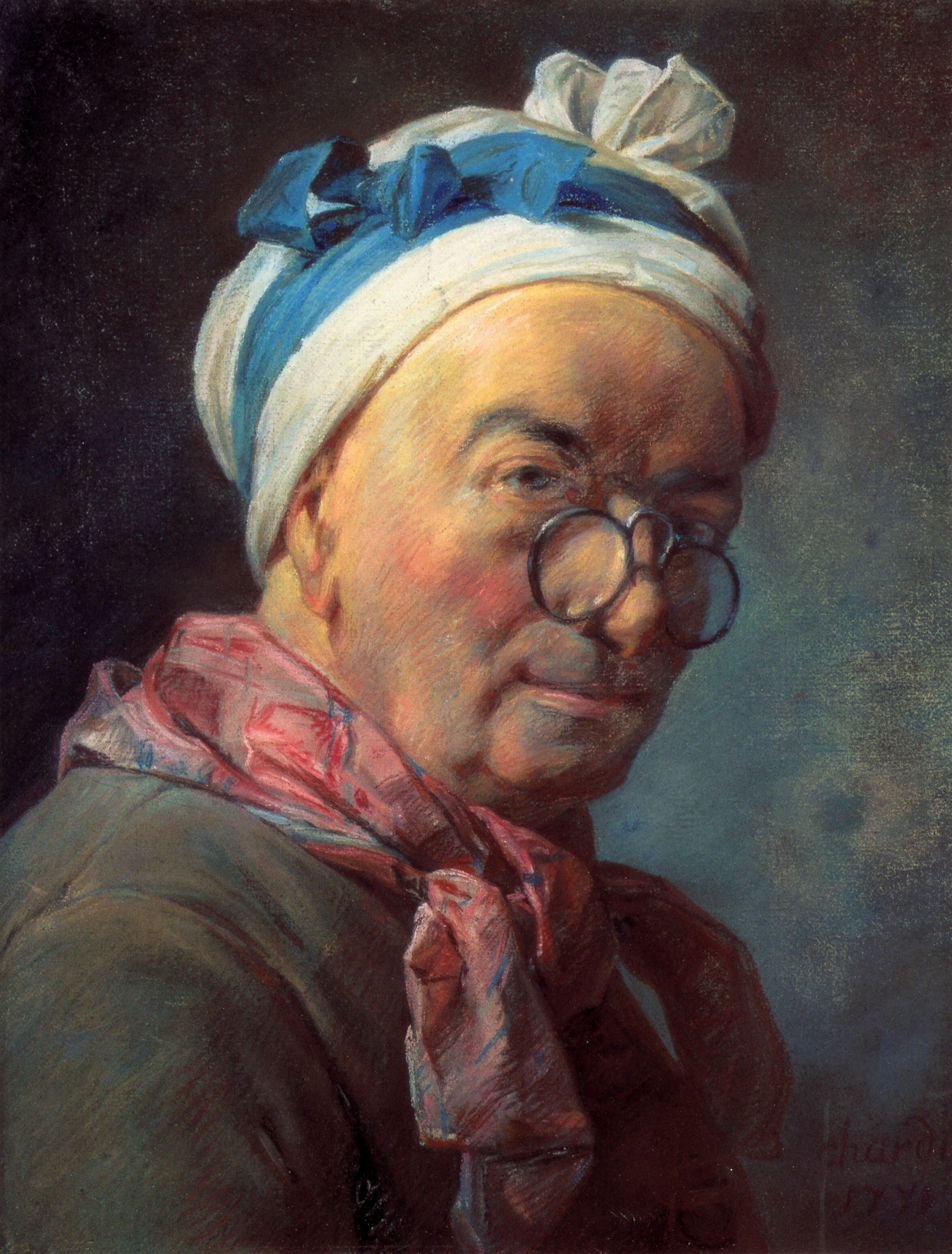
Jean-Baptiste-Siméon Chardin born 2 November

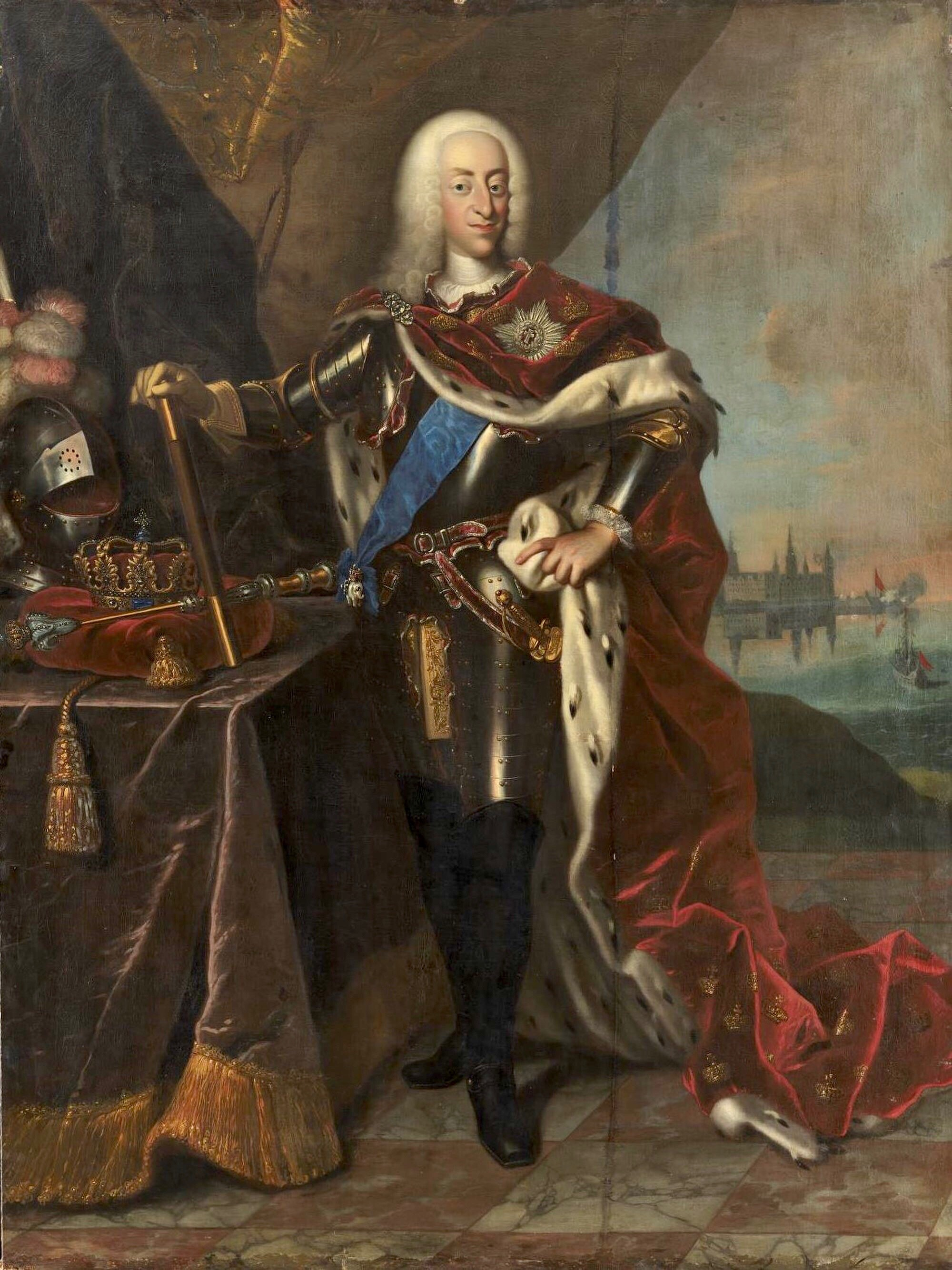
Christian VI, King of Denmark, born 30 November

=== January–March ===
- January 2 – FitzRoy Henry Lee, British officer of the Royal Navy, Commodore Governor of the Colony of Newfoundland (d. 1750)
- January 9
  - Christian Tobias Damm, renowned German Classical philologist (d. 1778)
  - Robert Joseph Pothier, French jurist (d. 1772)
- January 11 – Friedrich Wilhelm Quirin von Forcade de Biaix, Royal Prussian Lieutenant General (d. 1765)
- January 14 – Jakob Adlung, German organist, teacher, instrument maker, music historian, composer and music theorist (d. 1762)
- January 16 – Franz Christoph Anton, Count of Hohenzollern-Sigmaringen, member of the House of Hohenzollern (d. 1767)
- January 20 – Thomas Hervey, politician (d. 1775)
- January 30 – Infanta Francisca Josefa of Portugal, Portuguese princess, the last of eight children of King Peter II of Portugal (d. 1736)
- January 31 – Mathias Haydn, father of two famous composers (d. 1763)
- February 2 – Hugh MacDonald, Roman Catholic bishop, Vicar Apostolic of the Highland District of Scotland 1731–1773 (d. 1773)
- February 9 – Étienne Jeaurat, French painter (d. 1789)
- February 10 – George Bowman, 18th-century American pioneer (d. 1768)
- February 11
  - Bertrand-François Mahé de La Bourdonnais, French naval officer and colonial administrator (d. 1753)
  - Samuel Heathcote, British politician who sat in the House of Commons from 1740 to 1747 (d. 1775)
- February 14 – Odet-Joseph Giry, French clergyman (d. 1761)
- February 15 – Giovanni Maria Morlaiter, Italian sculptor of the Rococo or late-Baroque (d. 1782)
- February 17 – Georg Wenzeslaus von Knobelsdorff, painter and architect in Prussia (d. 1753)
- February 24 – Giuseppe Pascaletti, Italian painter (d. 1757)
- March 3 – Georg Detlev von Flemming, General in Polish-Saxon service (d. 1771)
- March 7 – António Nunes Ribeiro Sanches, 18th-century Portuguese physician (d. 1783)
- March 8 – Johan Friederich Wewer, Danish merchant and ship-owner (d. 1759)
- March 13 – Jacob Faggot, Swedish scientist, civil servant and surveyor (d. 1777)
- March 17
  - Radu Cantacuzino, 18th-century Romanian prince (d. 1761)
  - Charles O'Brien, 6th Viscount Clare, Irish military officer in French service (d. 1761)
- March 23 – John Bartram, American botanist (d. 1777)
- March 24
  - David Renaud Boullier, Dutch Huguenot theologian (d. 1759)
  - Paul Gottlieb Werlhof, German physician and poet who was a native of Helmstedt (d. 1767)
- March 25
  - James Calthorpe, Yeoman of the Removing Wardrobe (d. 1784)
  - Johann Adolph Hasse, German composer (d. 1783)
- March 26 – Hubert-François Gravelot, French engraver (d. 1773)
- March 30 – Edward Stradling, Welsh politician (d. 1726)
- March 31 – Françoise-Louise de Warens, benefactress and mistress of Jean-Jacques Rousseau (d. 1762)

=== April–June ===
- April 3 – Jean-Baptiste Forqueray, player of the viol and a composer (d. 1782)
- April 10 – Catharina Sperling-Heckel, German miniature painter (d. 1741)
- April 13 – Alexander Ross, Scottish poet (d. 1784)
- April 14 – Frederick III, Duke of Saxe-Gotha-Altenburg (d. 1772)
- April 17 – Robert Blair, Scottish poet and cleric (d. 1746)
- April 19 – Valentin Metzinger, French-born Austrian-Slovenian painter (d. 1759)
- April 20 – Sir Thomas Lowther, 2nd Baronet, English landowner (d. 1745)
- April 25 – Johann Gottlieb Siegel, German legal scholar (d. 1755)
- April 27
  - Thomas Belasyse, 1st Earl Fauconberg, British peer (d. 1774)
  - Jacopo Stellini, Italian abbot (d. 1770)
  - Albert Wolfgang, Count of Schaumburg-Lippe, ruler of the County of Schaumburg-Lippe (d. 1748)
- April 28 – Joseph Spence, historian (d. 1768)
- May 2 – Daniel Betts Jr., member of the Connecticut House of Representatives from Norwalk (d. 1783)
- May 13 – Marquis of Pombal, Prime Minister of Portugal (d. 1782)
- May 14
  - Ryk Tulbagh, Governor of the Dutch Cape Colony (d. 1771)
  - Hans Joachim von Zieten, Prussian field marshal (d. 1786)
- May 15 – Sampson Lloyd, English iron manufacturer and banker, who co-founded Lloyds Bank (d. 1779)
- May 23 – William Parks, 18th-century printer and journalist in England and Colonial America (d. 1750)
- May 24 – Adam Ignacy Komorowski, Polish Roman Catholic archbishop (d. 1759)
- May 25
  - Pattee Byng, 2nd Viscount Torrington, British Army officer and politician (d. 1747)
  - Anna Leszczyńska, eldest child of Stanisław Leszczyński and Catherine Opalińska (d. 1717)
- May 26 – Nikita Trubetskoy, Russian statesman, Field Marshal, minister of defense of Russia (d. 1767)
- May 28 – Laurent Cars, French designer and engraver (d. 1771)
- May 29 – Pierre Rémond de Sainte-Albine, 18th-century French historian and playwright (d. 1778)
- May 31 – Alexander Cruden, Scottish author of an early concordance to the Bible (d. 1770)
- June 4 – William Moore, Banbury MP (d. 1746)
- June 6
  - Johann Georg Estor, German theorist of public law (d. 1773)
  - Alamgir II, the fifteenth Mughal Emperor of India (d. 1759)
- June 17 – François-Alexandre Aubert de La Chesnaye Des Bois, French writer, genealogist and compiler (d. 1784)
- June 20 – William Gustav of Anhalt-Dessau, German prince of the House of Ascania, heir to the principality of Anhalt-Dessau (d. 1737)
- June 26 – Marie Thérèse Rodet Geoffrin, French salon holder (d. 1777)

=== July–September ===
- July 14
  - Vere Beauclerk, 1st Baron Vere, Royal Navy officer, British peer and MP (d. 1781)
  - Philipp Ludwig von Sinzendorf, Austrian cardinal of the Catholic Church (d. 1747)
- July 15
  - Richard Crowle, Yorkshire lawyer and a Member of Parliament for Kingston upon Hull (d. 1757)
  - Henrietta Knight, Lady Luxborough, English poet and letter writer, now mainly remembered as a gardener (d. 1756)
- July 18 – Barthélemy Hus-Desforges, 18th-century French comedian and troupe leader (d. 1786)
- July 21 – Heinrich XXIX, Count of Reuss-Ebersdorf, member of the House of Reuss Younger Line, Count Ebersdorf from 1711 until his death (d. 1747)
- July 25 – Charles Beckingham, English poet and dramatist (d. 1731)
- July 28
  - John Coutts, British merchant and banker who became Lord Provost of Edinburgh in 1742 (d. 1750)
  - Princess Amalia d'Este (d. 1778)
- August 5 – Ferdinand Maria Innocenz of Bavaria, Bavarian prince and an Imperial Field marshal (d. 1738)
- August 10 – Christoph Gottlieb Schröter, German composer and organist (d. 1782)
- August 25 – Charles Étienne Louis Camus, French mathematician and mechanician born at Crécy-en-Brie (d. 1768)
- August 29 – Mastani, daughter of Chhatrasal and Ruhani Bai Begum (d. 1740)
- August 30 – James Wemyss, 5th Earl of Wemyss, son of David Wemyss (d. 1756)
- September 1 – George Benson, English Presbyterian pastor and theologian (d. 1762)
- September 2 – Elizabeth Younger, actress and dancer (d. 1762)
- September 11 – Anna Maria of Liechtenstein, princess consort of Liechtenstein (d. 1753)
- September 12 – John Martyn, English botanist (d. 1768)
- September 28 – Johann Friedrich Ruhe, German composer (d. 1776)
- September 29 – Charles Calvert, 5th Baron Baltimore, British nobleman and Proprietary Governor of the Province of Maryland (d. 1751)

=== October–December ===
- October 2 – Ferdinande Henriette, Countess of Stolberg-Gedern (d. 1750)
- October 4 – Vieira Lusitano, Portuguese court painter (d. 1783)
- October 10 – William Prentis, merchant in Williamsburg, Virginia (d. 1765)
- October 13 – Jeanne Quinault, French actress and playwright (d. 1783)
- October 21 – Hans Christoph Friedrich Graf von Hacke, Prussian General and Commandant of Berlin (d. 1754)
- October 23 – John Verney, British barrister, judge, Tory and then Whig politician and MP (d. 1741)
- October 27 – Thomas Fonnereau, British merchant and politician (d. 1779)
- November 2 – Jean-Baptiste-Siméon Chardin, French painter (d. 1779)
- November 5 – Merrik Burrell, British politician (d. 1787)
- November 8 – Sir Erasmus Philipps, 5th Baronet (d. 1743)
- November 9 – Sir Robert Kemp, 4th Baronet, British landowner, Tory politician and MP (d. 1752)
- November 11
  - Ferdinando Fuga, Italian architect (d. 1782)
  - Sulaiman Badrul Alam Shah of Johor, 12th Sultan and Yang di-Pertuan Besar of Johor and Pahang and their dependencies who reigned from 1722 to 1760 (d. 1760)
  - Natalia Lopukhina, Russian noble (d. 1763)
- November 18 – Gerrit Braamcamp, successful Roman Catholic distiller (d. 1771)
- November 20 – Antun Kanižlić, Croatian Jesuit and poet (d. 1777)
- November 22 – François de Chennevières, French poet and librettist (d. 1779)
- November 25 – Pierre Subleyras, French painter (d. 1749)
- November 30 – King Christian VI of Denmark (d. 1746)
- December 2 – John White, English politician who sat in the House of Commons (d. 1769)
- December 11 – Sarah Chapone, English legal theorist, pamphleteer, and prolific letter writer (d. 1764)
- December 17 – Charles-Louis Mion, French composer (d. 1775)
- December 19 – William Bowyer, English printer (d. 1777)
- December 29 – Friedrich Ludwig Abresch, Dutch philologist of German origins (d. 1782)

== Deaths ==
1690

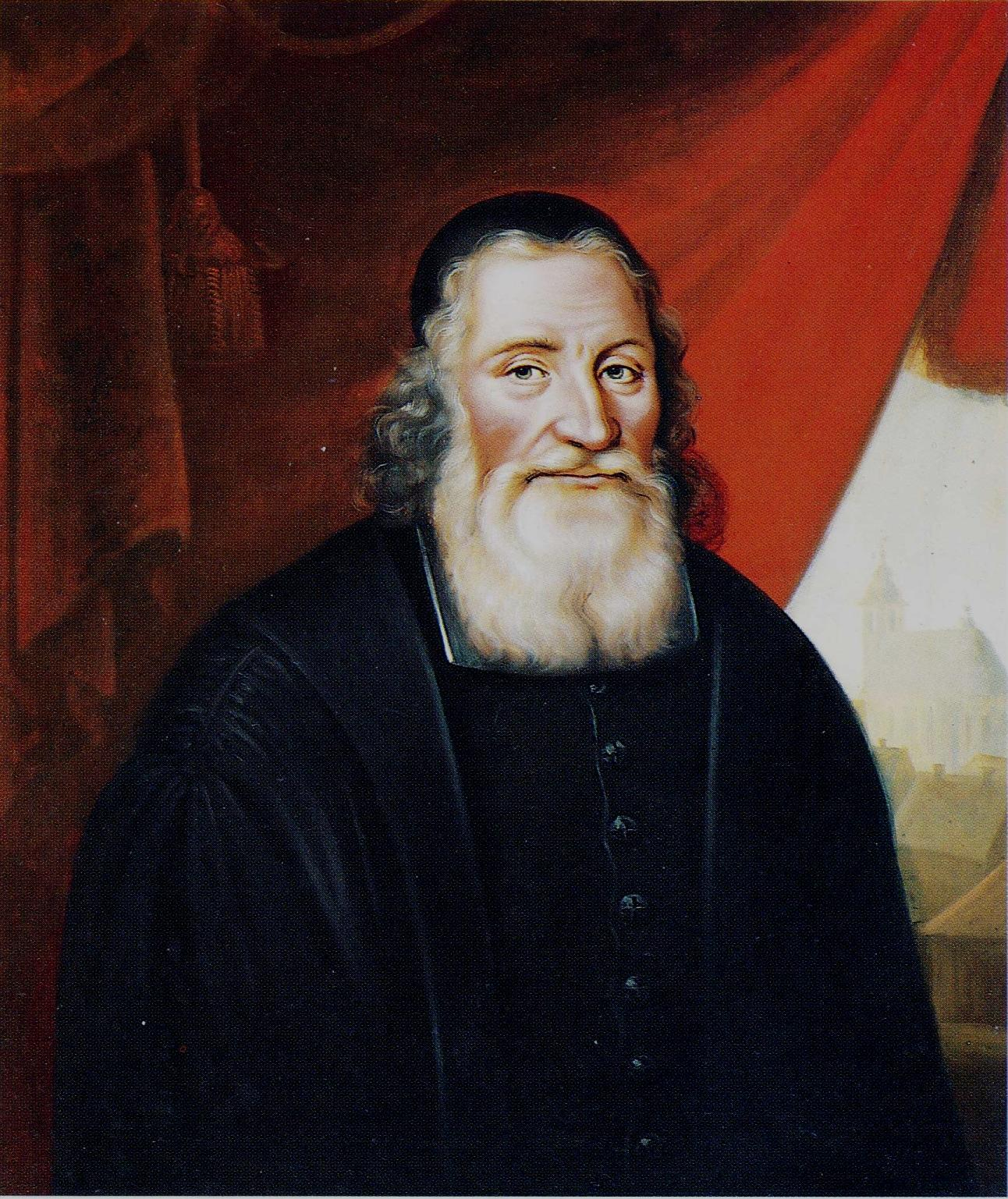
Johannes Gezelius the elder died 20 January

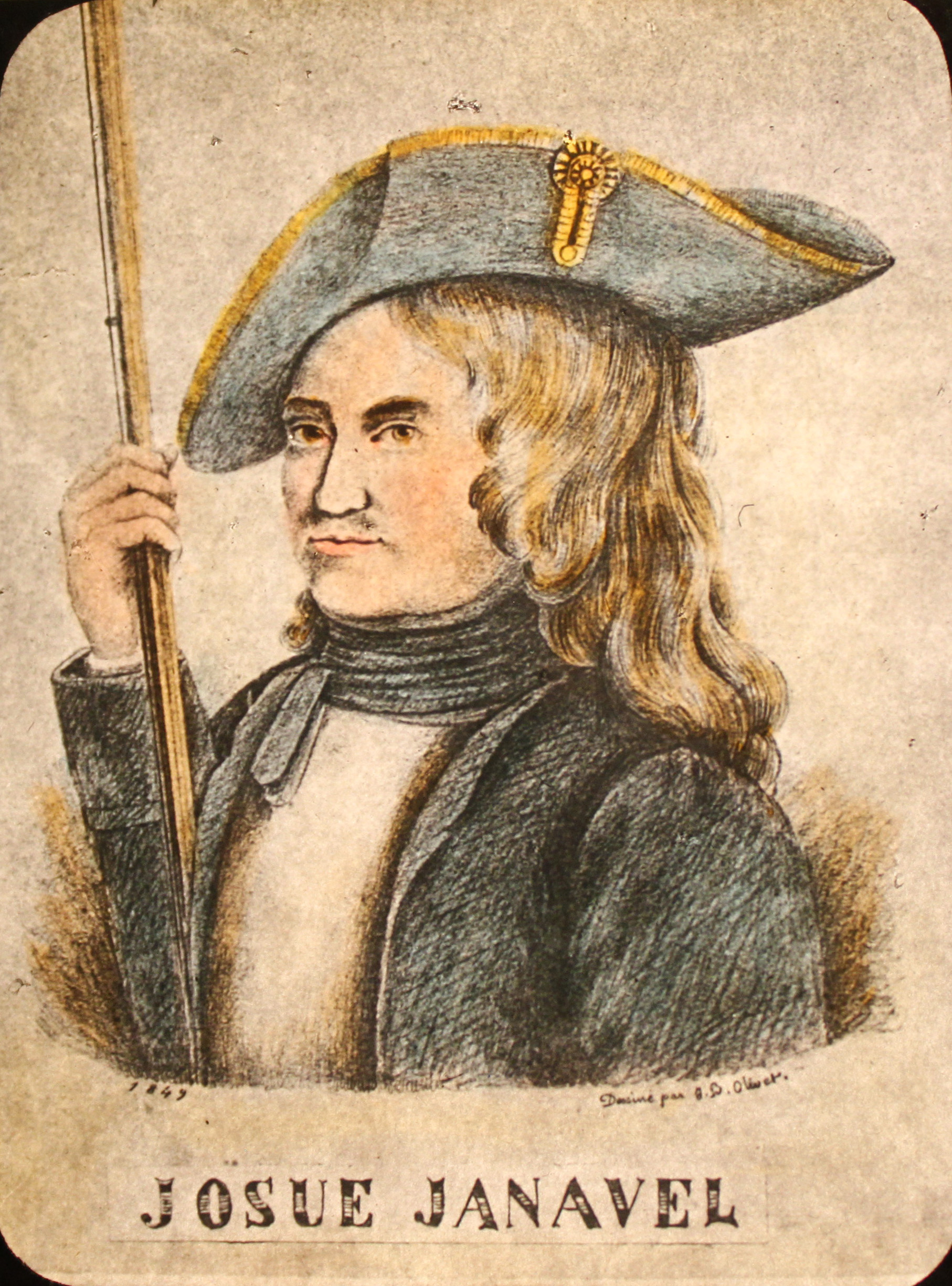
Joshua Janavel died 5 March

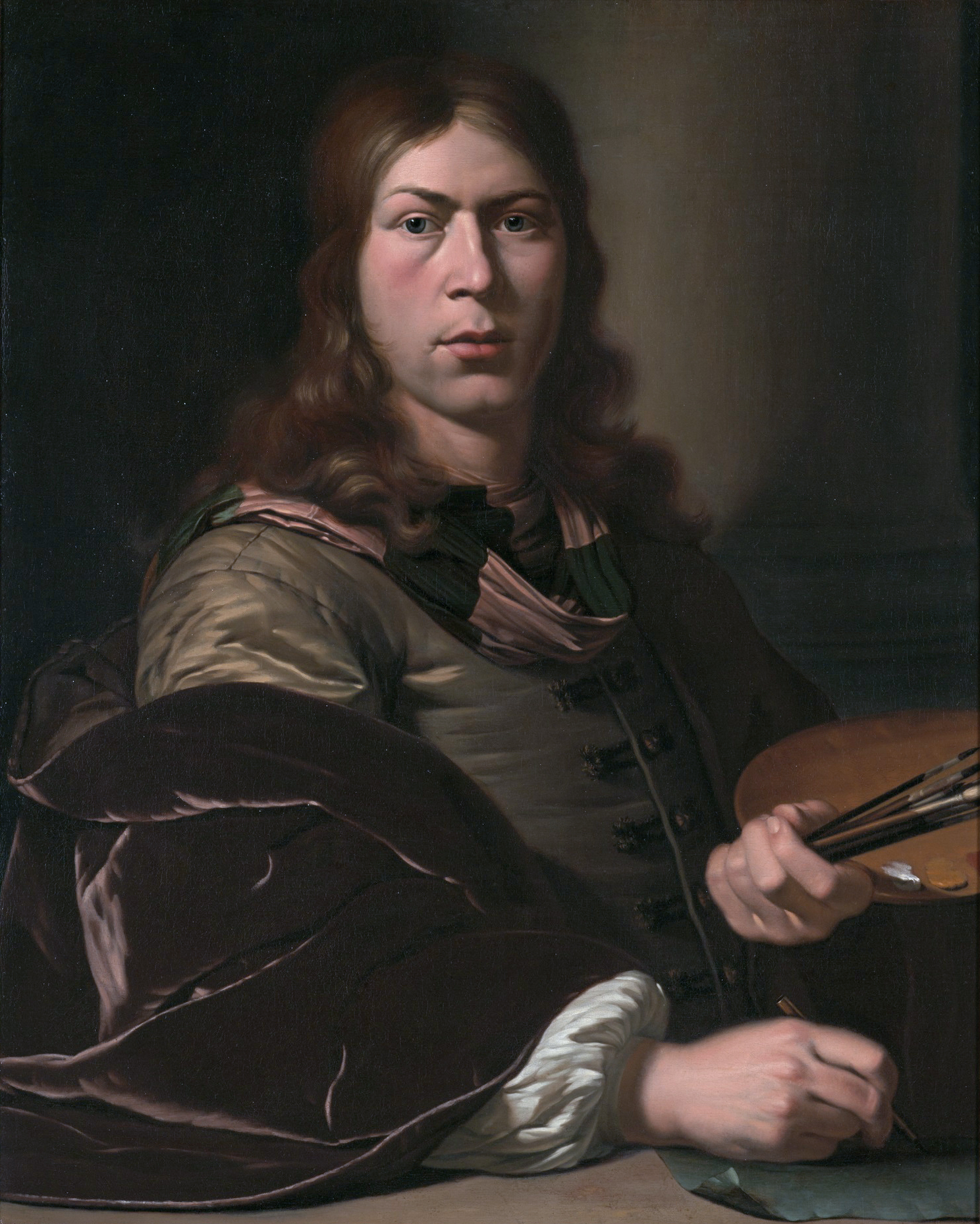
Jan van Mieris died 17 March

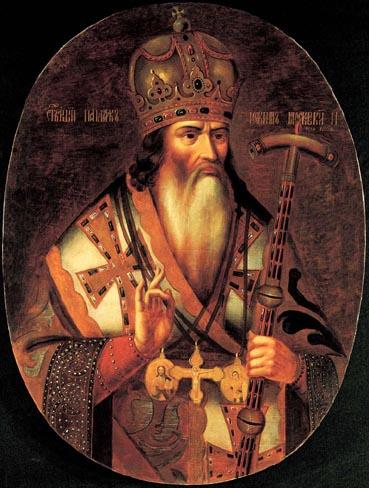
Patriarch Joachim of Moscow died 17 March

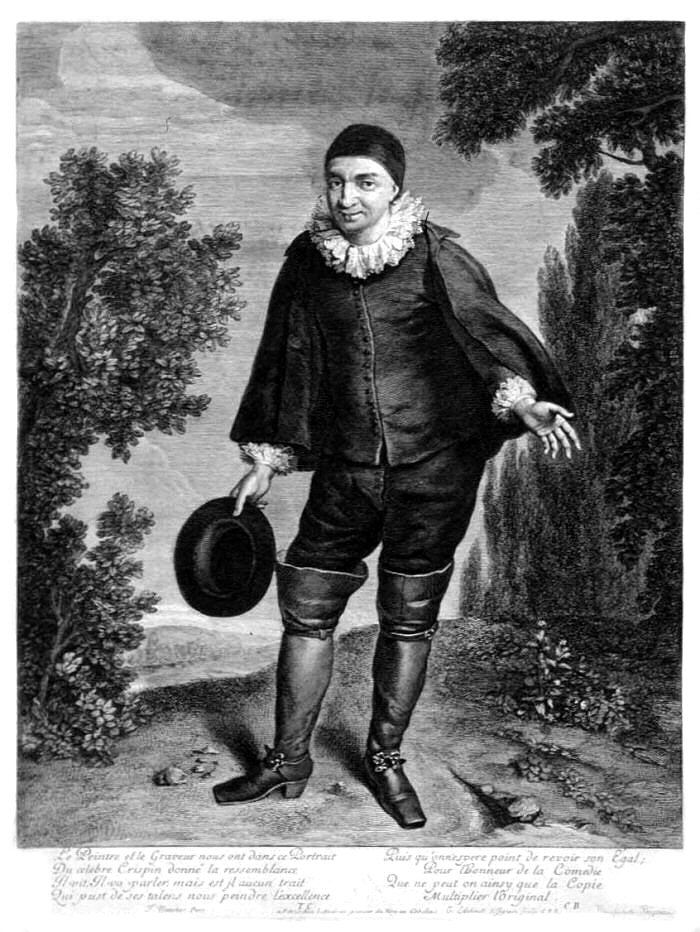
Raymond Poisson died 9 May

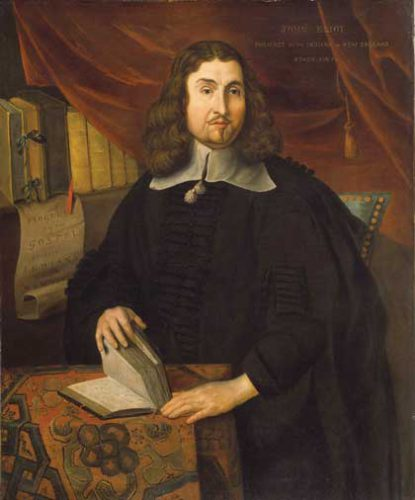
John Eliot (missionary) died 21 May

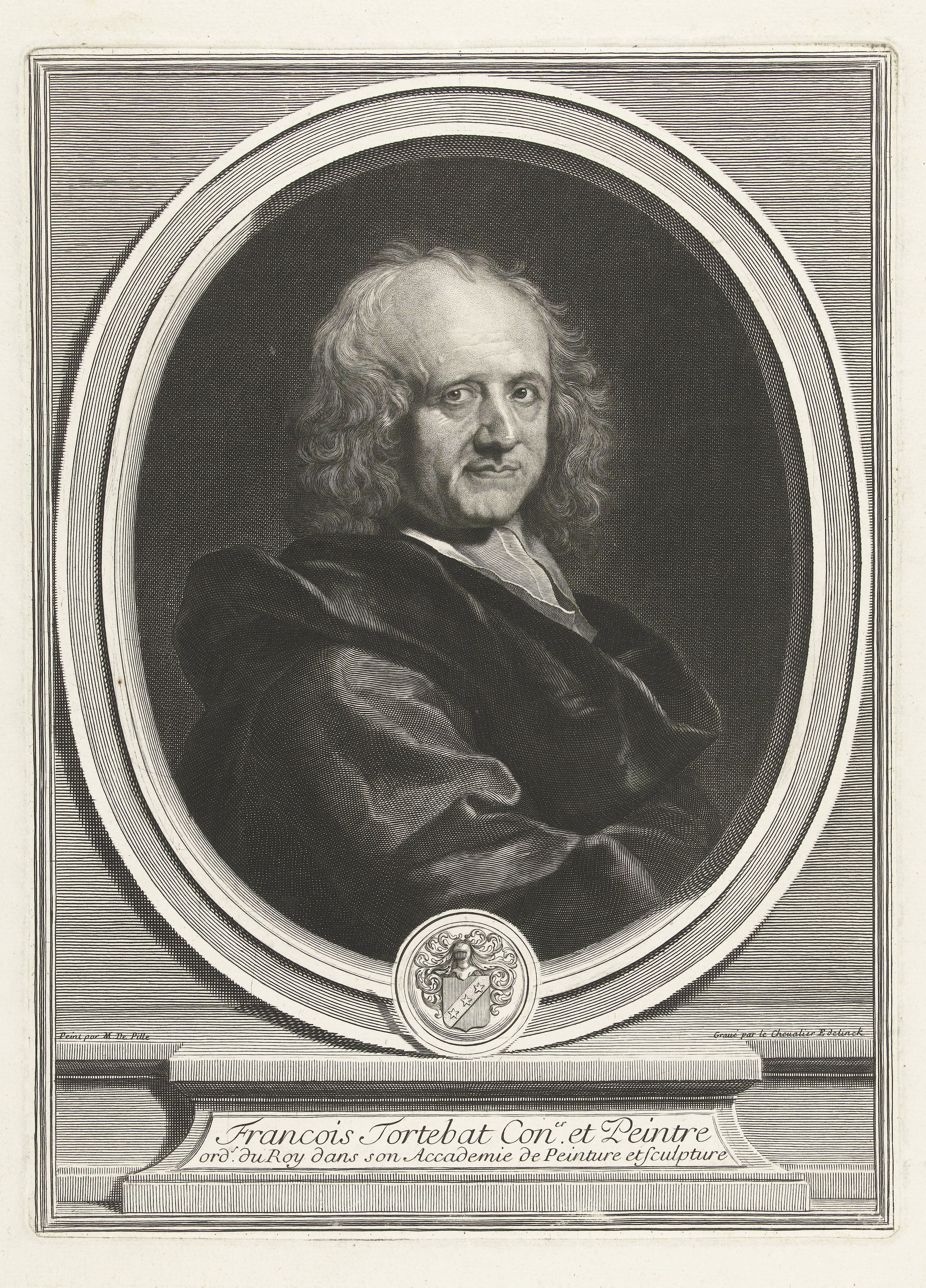
François Tortebat died 4 June

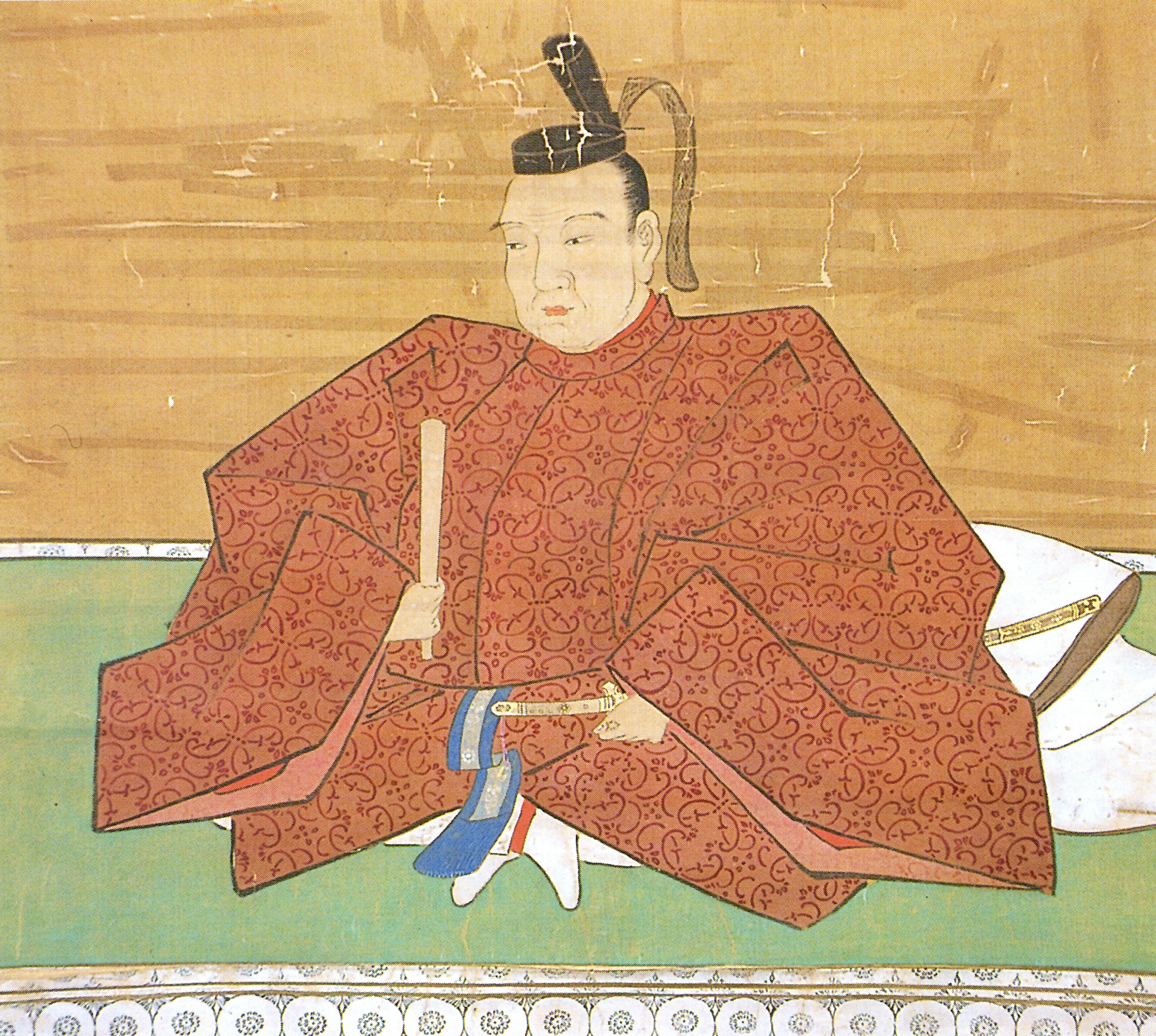
Hosokawa Yukitaka died 9 July

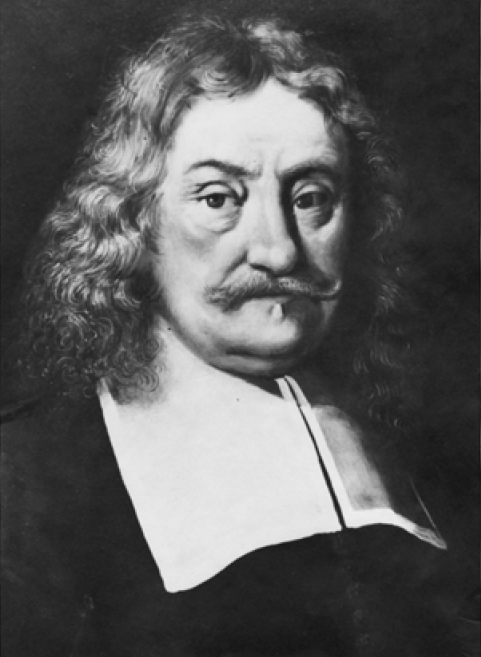
Gottfried Welsch died 5 September

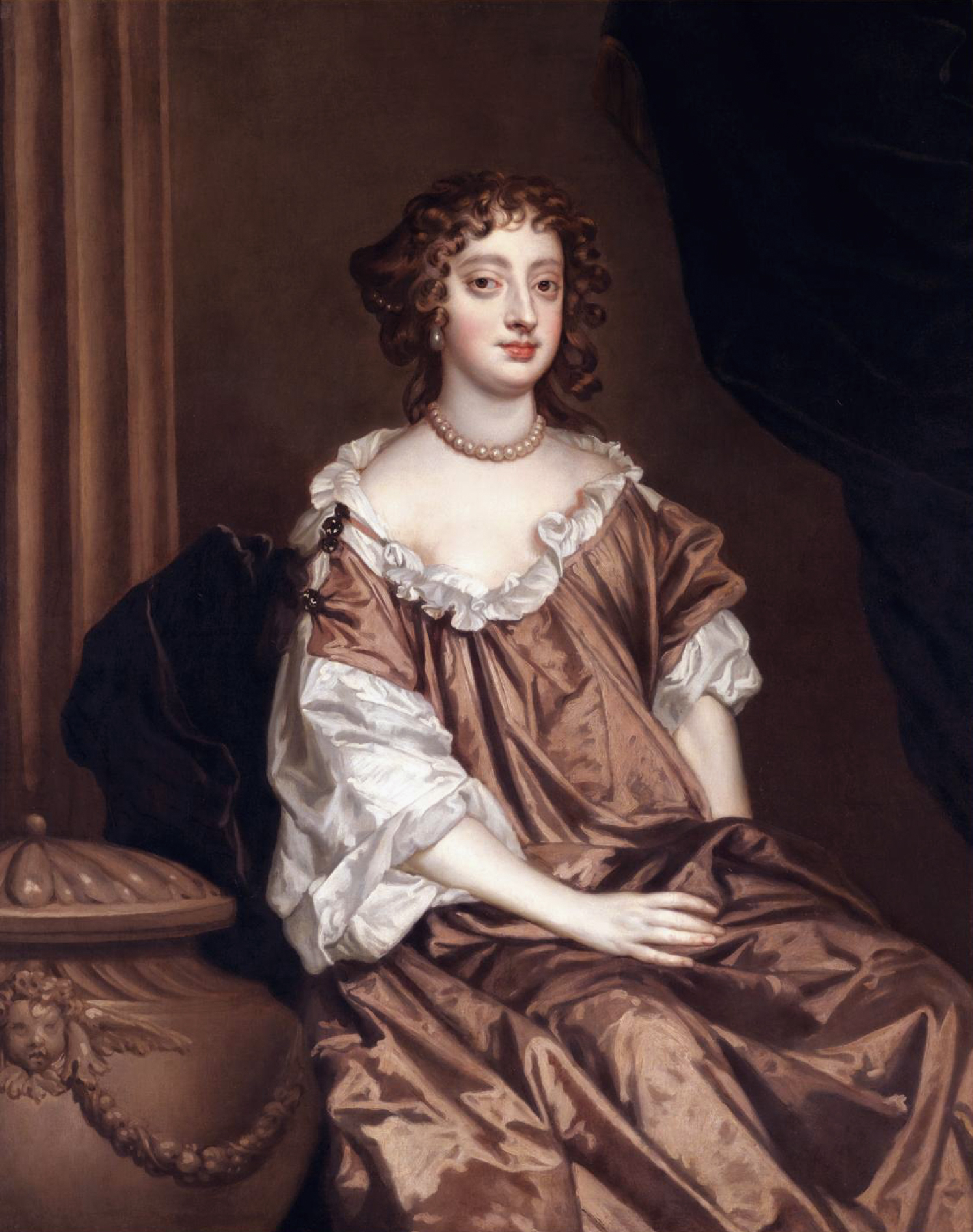
Elizabeth Percy, Countess of Northumberland died 19 September

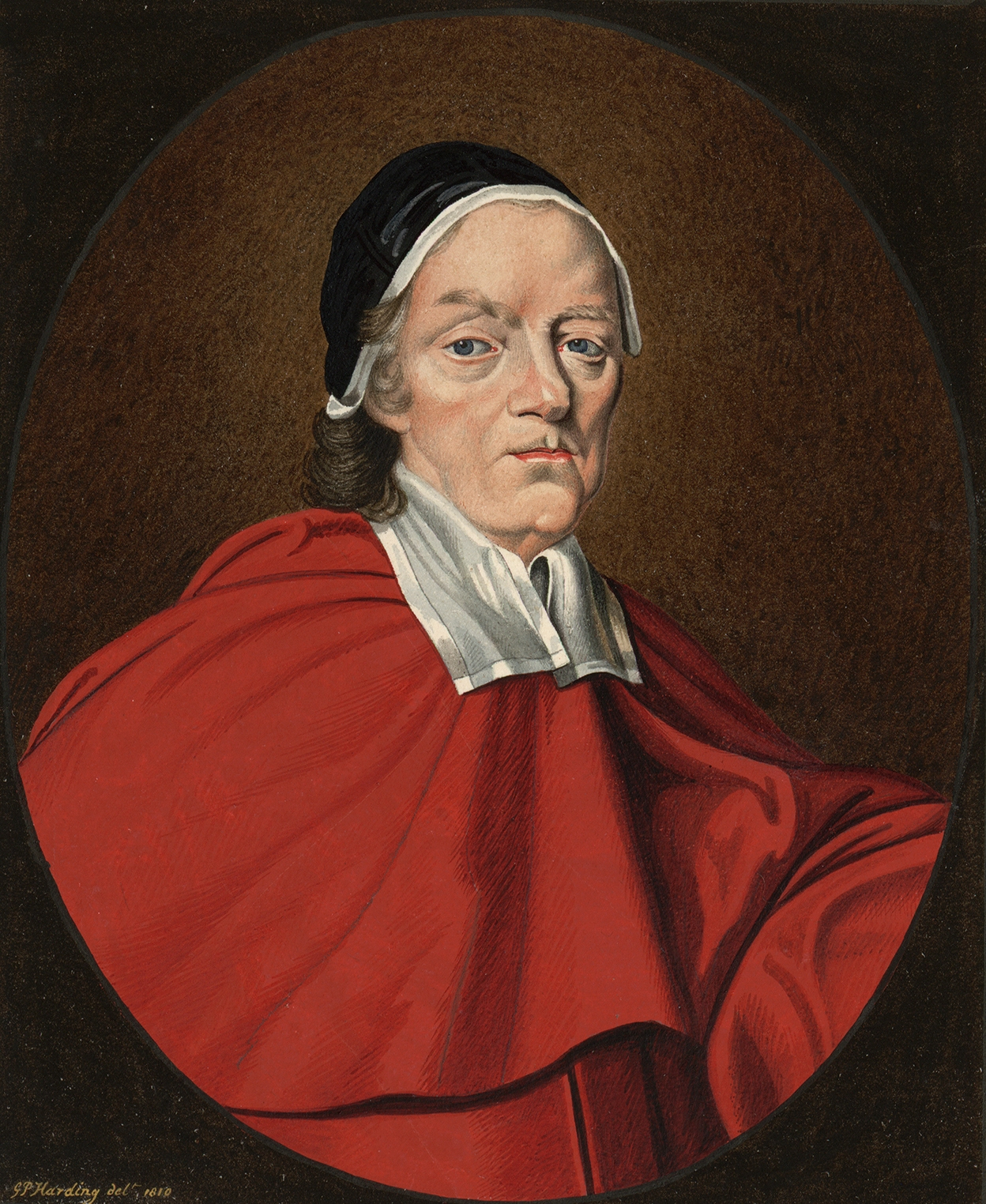
John Maynard (1604–1690) died 9 October

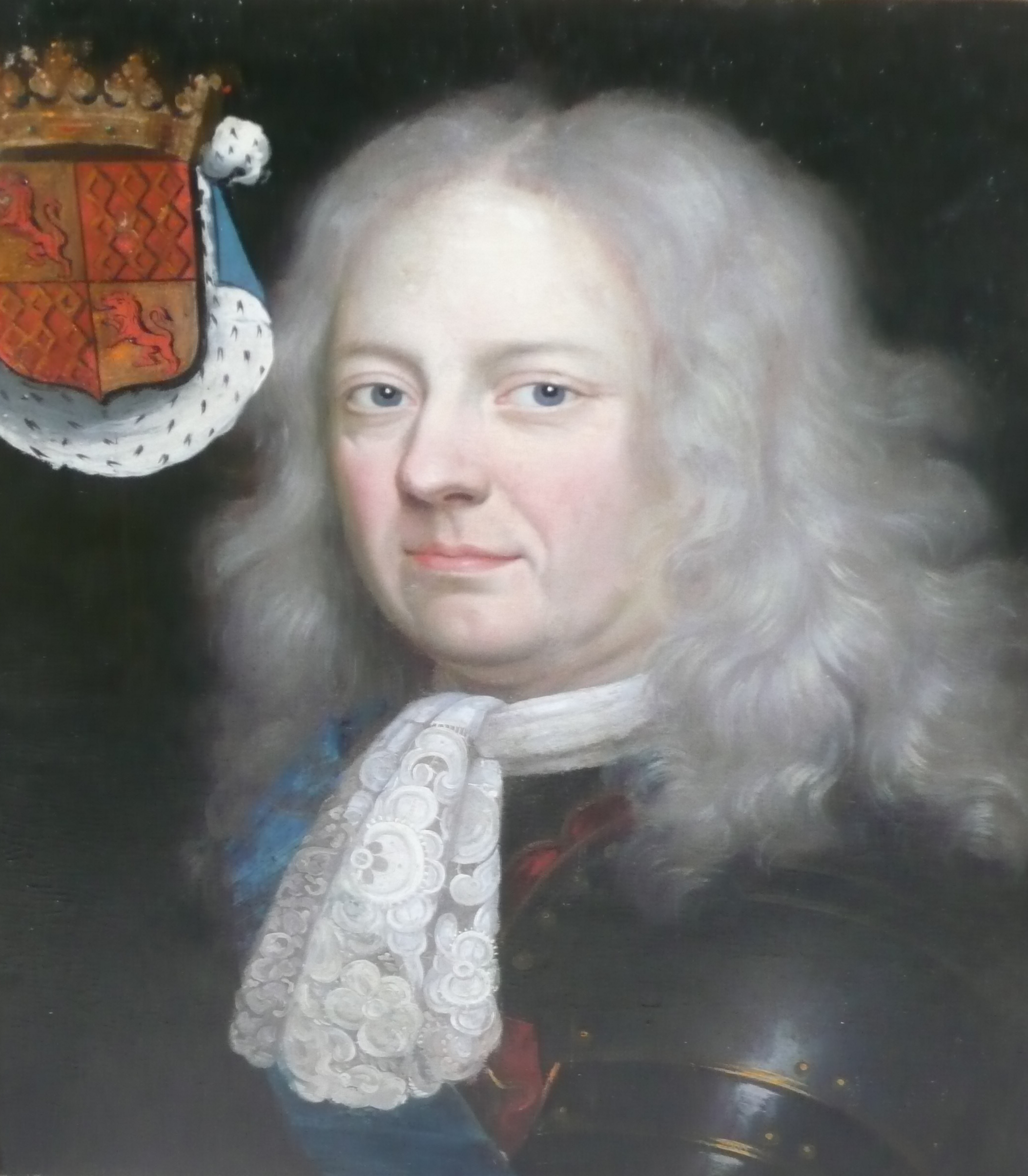
Louis Charles d'Albert de Luynes died 10 October

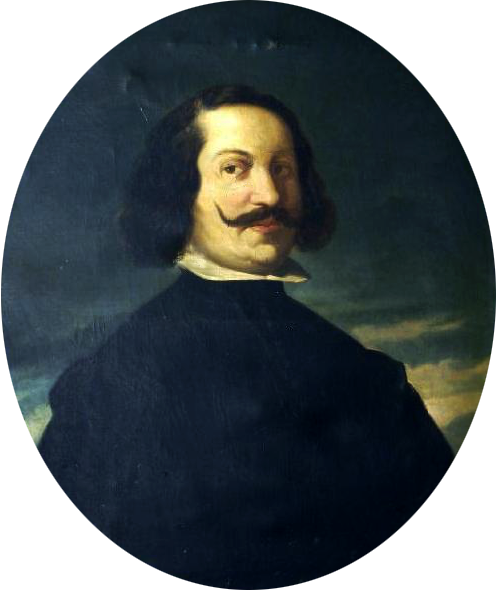
Juan de Valdés Leal died 15 October

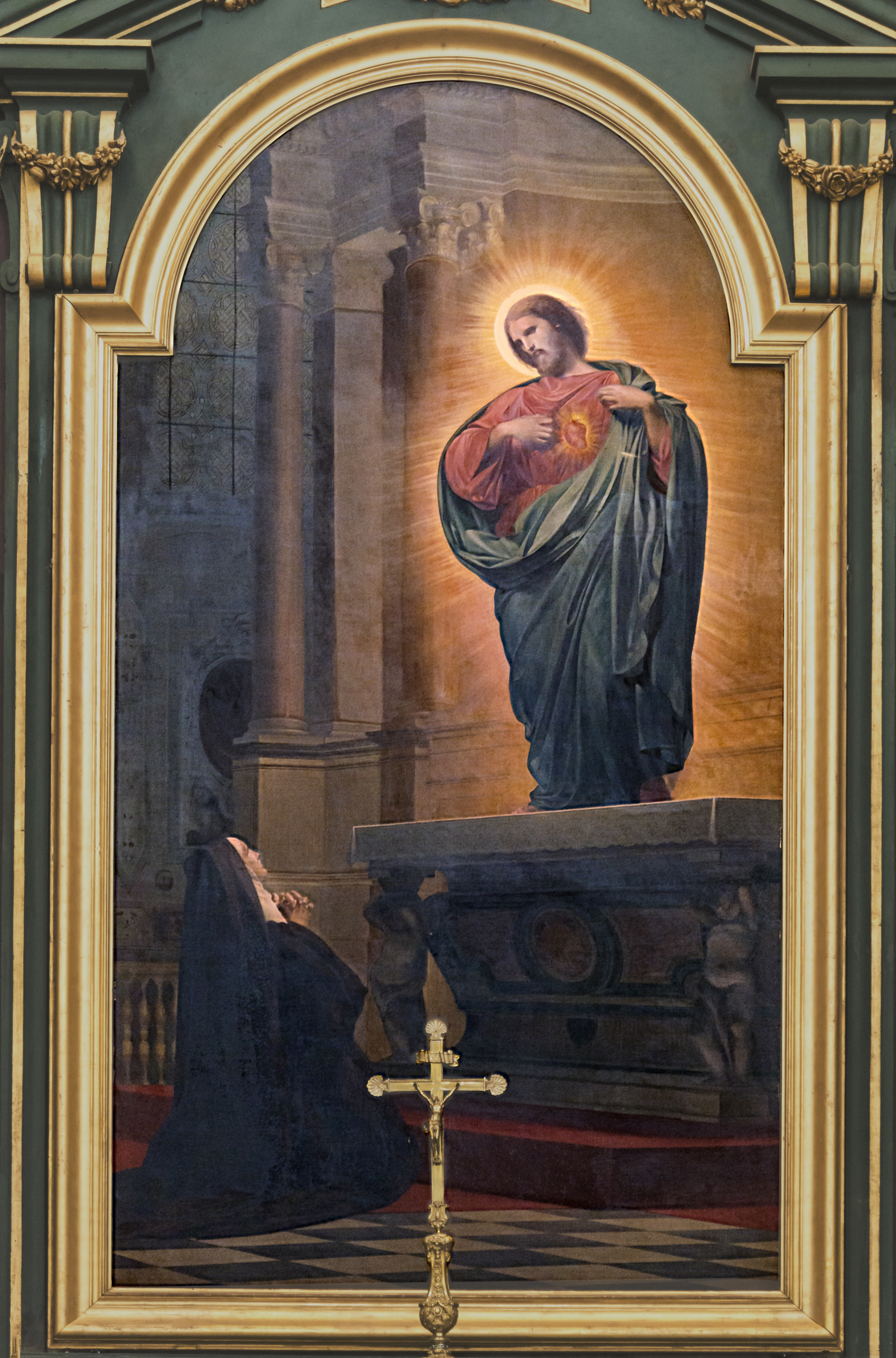
Margaret Mary Alacoque died 17 October

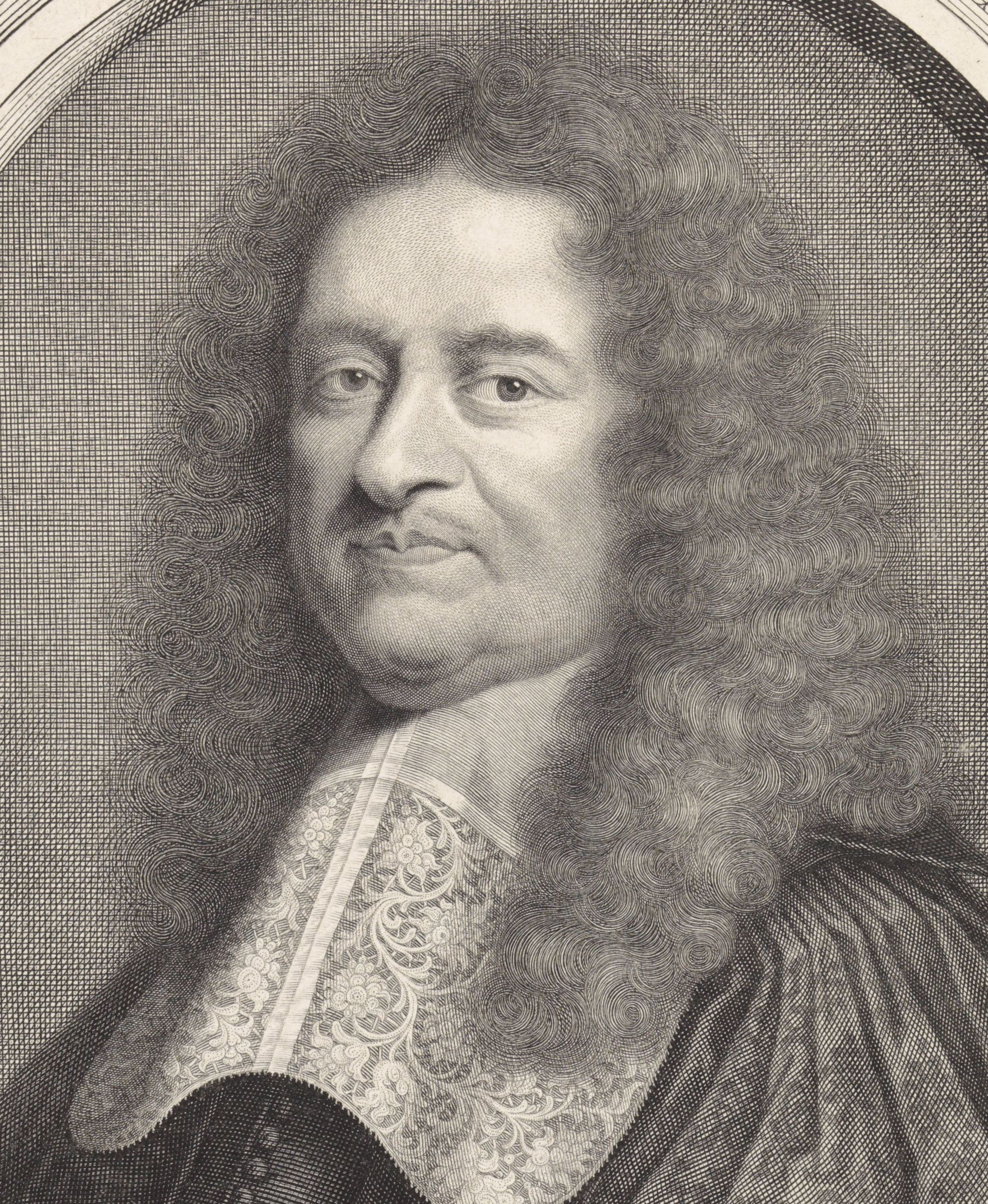
Jean-Baptiste Christyn died 25 October

=== January–March ===
- February 14 – John Berry, Royal Navy officer (b. 1635)
- January 3 – Hillel ben Naphtali Zevi, Lithuanian rabbi (b. 1615)
- January 8 – Andrei Bezobrazov, Russian official (b. 1614)
- January 20 – Johannes Gezelius the elder, Finnish bishop (b. 1615)
- January 26 – Marcjan Aleksander Ogiński, Polish noble (b. 1632)
- January 27 – Anna Eleonore of Stolberg-Wernigerode, politician (b. 1651)
- February 1
  - George Livingston, 3rd Earl of Linlithgow, Scottish politician (b. 1616)
  - Philippe Mestrezat, Genevan minister (b. 1618)
- February 3 – Anne Doddington (b. 1642)
- February 6 – Jan van Buken, Flemish painter (b. 1635)
- February 7
  - John Faldo, English minister (b. 1633)
  - Sir William Morice, 1st Baronet, English royalist statesman (b. 1620)
- February 9
  - John Louis, Count of Nassau-Ottweiler (b. 1625)
  - David Pieterse Schuyler, Dutch-born fur trader, ship's captain and merchant (b. 1636)
- February 10 – Gijsbert Verhoek, Dutch painter (b. 1644)
- February 20 – Theodor Caroli, German physician (b. 1660)
- February 22 – Charles Le Brun, French painter and art theorist (b. 1619)
- February 23 – Elizabeth Walker, English pharmacist (b. 1623)
- February 27 – Edward Montagu, English politician (b. 1649)
- March 1 – Richard Wenman, 4th Viscount Wenman, English politician and Irish Viscount (b. 1657)
- March 5 – Joshua Janavel, waldensian rebel (b. 1617)
- March 17
  - Jan van Mieris, Dutch painter (b. 1660)
  - Patriarch Joachim of Moscow, Patriarch of Moscow (b. 1620)
- March 18 – Sir William Portman, 6th Baronet, English politician (b. 1643)
- March 20 – Sebastián Muñoz, painter (b. 1654)
- March 21 – Henry Teonge, British writer (b. 1621)
- March 28 – Emmanuel Tzanes, Greek Painter (b. 1610)

=== April–June ===
- April 1
  - James Annesley, 2nd Earl of Anglesey, politician (b. 1645)
  - Johann Christoph von Freyberg-Allmendingen, German priest (b. 1616)
- April 6 – Gedeon Chetvertinsky, Ruthenian prince, religious figure, Metropolitan of Kiev (b. 1634)
- April 15 – Michael I Apafi, Hungarian Prince of Transylvania (b. 1632)
- April 16 – Gesina ter Borch, Dutch Golden Age painter (b. 1633)
- April 17 – Caspar Ziegler, German jurist, poet and composer (b. 1621)
- April 18
  - Melchior Heßler, German engineer and builder (b. 1619)
  - Ayaşlı Ismail Pasha, Ottoman Grand Vizier (b. 1620)
  - Charles V, Duke of Lorraine, Austrian-born general of the Holy Roman Empire (b. 1643)
- April 20 – Maria Anna Victoria of Bavaria, Dauphine of France (b. 1660)
- April 21 – Jacob de Graeff, member of the De Graeff-family from the Dutch Golden Age (b. 1642)
- April 25 – David Teniers the Younger, Flemish painter (b. 1610)
- April 28 – Étienne Le Hongre, French sculptor (b. 1628)
- April 30 – René Le Pays, French poet (b. 1634)
- May 9
  - Theodore Haak, German-born scholar (b. 1605)
  - Raymond Poisson, French actor (b. 1630)
  - Abraham Wright, English theological writer and deacon (b. 1611)
- May 12 – John Rushworth, English author of Historical Collections (b. c. 1612)
- May 15 – Eberhard Werner Happel, author (b. 1647)
- May 21 – John Eliot, Puritan missionary to the American Indians (b. 1604)
- May 22 – Johann Jacob Schütz, German lawyer (b. 1640)
- May 23 – Francesco di Maria, Italian painter (b. 1623)
- May 26
  - Samuel Lincoln, American colonial ancestor of Abraham Lincoln (b. 1622)
  - Luís de Meneses, 3rd Count of Ericeira, Portuguese politician and historian (b. 1632)
- May 27 – Giovanni Legrenzi, Italian composer (b. 1626)
- June 4
  - Sir Charles Erskine, 1st Baronet of Alva, Scottish politician (b. 1643)
  - François Tortebat, French engraver (b. 1616)
- June 8 – Jean Prestet, French priest and mathematician (b. 1648)
- June 11 – Frederik Bloemaert, Dutch printmaker and draftsman (b. 1610)
- June 13 – Maurice Berkeley, 3rd Viscount Fitzhardinge, English politician (b. 1628)
- June 19 – Ezekiel Hopkins, Irish bishop (b. 1634)

=== July–September ===
- July 1
  - Albrecht Georg of Limburg, Count of Limburg (b. 1660)
  - Sir Neil O'Neill, 2nd Baronet, Irish Catholic nobleman and soldier (b. 1658)
  - Philipp, Duke of Saxe-Merseburg-Lauchstädt, German nobleman (b. 1657)
  - George Walker, Irish soldier and Anglican priest (b. 1645)
- July 8 – Aaron ben Moses Teomim, rabbi (b. 1630)
- July 9 – Hosokawa Yukitaka, daimyo (b. 1637)
- July 10
  - Jan van Brakel, Dutch admiral (b. 1638)
  - Domenico Gabrielli, Italian cellist and composer (b. 1659)
- July 11
  - John Burnyeat, British Quaker writer (b. 1631)
  - Frederick Schomberg, 1st Duke of Schomberg, Marshal of France (b. 1615)
- July 15 – Carlo Antonio Bussi, Swiss artist (b. 1658)
- July 21
  - Gregorio Carafa, Calabrian-born 62nd Grandmaster of the Knights Hospitaller (b. 1615)
  - Cristobal of Saint Catherine, Spanish Catholic priest (b. 1638)
- July 23 – Richard Gibson, British artist (b. 1615)
- July 25 – François Bailly, French mason and architect (b. 1630)
- July 28 – Baptist Noel, English politician (b. 1658)
- July 29 – John Brockett, co-founder of New Haven Colony (b. 1611)
- August 5 – Sebastiano Pisani, Roman Catholic prelate who was Bishop of Verona (b. 1630)
- August 10 – Johannes Spilberg, Dutch painter (b. 1619)
- August 17 – Gasparo Cavalieri, Italian cardinal (b. 1648)
- August 20 – Alexander von Bournonville, Flemish noble and general (b. 1616)
- August 31 – Mary Thimelby, prioress of St Monica's, Louvain, and author (b. 1610)
- September 2 – Philip William, Elector Palatine, German-born ruler (b. 1615)
- September 5
  - Louis-François de la Baume de Suze, Roman Catholic bishop (b. 1595)
  - Gottfried Welsch, German physician (b. 1618)
- September 8
  - Jens Mikkelsen Ehrenborg, Danish soldier and public servant who later became a Swedish nobleman (b. 1621)
  - Sir William Glynne, 1st Baronet, English politician (b. 1638)
  - Sebastien Knab, Roman Catholic prelate, Archbishop of Nakhijevan (b. 1632)
  - Lazzaro Morelli, Italian artist (b. 1608)
- September 14 – José Jiménez Donoso, painter (b. 1632)
- September 17 – William Pierrepont, 4th Earl of Kingston-upon-Hull, English Earl (b. 1662)
- September 19
  - Giovanni Stefano Danedi, Italian painter (b. 1612)
  - Elizabeth Percy, Countess of Northumberland, English noble (b. 1646)
- September 21 – Wriothesley Noel, 2nd Earl of Gainsborough, English politician (b. 1661)
- September 23 – Yebušu, duke of the First Rank (b. 1627)
- September 25 – Pieter van Lint, Flemish painter (b. 1609)
- September 26 – Joachim Ernst von Grumbkow, German general (b. 1637)

=== October–December ===
- October 1 – Girolamo Corner, Venetian statesman and military commander (b. 1632)
- October 3 – Robert Barclay, Scottish Quaker apologist (b. 1648)
- October 7
  - Arnold van Ravesteyn, Dutch Golden Age painter (b. 1605)
  - Jacques Savary, successful French merchant (b. 1622)
- October 9
  - Henry FitzRoy, 1st Duke of Grafton, Illegitimate son of King Charles II and English duke (b. 1663)
  - Joseph Judson, deputy (b. 1619)
  - John Maynard, English lawyer and politician; (b. 1604)
- October 10
  - Laurids Lindenov, Danish nobleman and civil servant in Norway (b. 1640)
  - Louis Charles d'Albert de Luynes, French aristocrat (b. 1620)
- October 13 – Ole Borch, Danish scientist (b. 1626)
- October 15
  - Juan de Valdés Leal, Spanish painter and etcher (b. 1622)
  - Adam Frans van der Meulen, Flemish painter (b. 1632)
- October 17 – Margaret Mary Alacoque, Catholic Saint and Mystic (b. 1647)
- October 20 – Sir Henry Felton, 2nd Baronet, English Member of Parliament (b. 1619)
- October 21 – Isabel Luísa, Princess of Beira, Portuguese Royal (b. 1669)
- October 22 (buried) – William Ball (astronomer), English astronomer (b. c. 1631)
- October 23
  - Thomas Minor, American city founder (b. 1608)
  - Antonie Waterloo, Flemish painter and engraver (b. 1609)
- October 25
  - Jean-Baptiste Christyn, Jurist and diplomat in the Spanish Netherlands and Chancellor of Brabant (b. 1630)
  - Cornelius Hazart, Dutch Jesuit priest, polemical author (b. 1617)
- October 27 – Sir Robert Markham, 2nd Baronet, English politician (b. 1644)
- October 30 – Hieronymus van Beverningh, Dutch diplomat and politician (b. 1614)
- November 3
  - Jean-Baptiste Colbert, Marquis de Seignelay, French politician (b. 1651)
  - Nicholas Delves, English politician (b. 1618)
- November 4 – Johann Wilhelm, Duke of Saxe-Jena, German noble (b. 1675)
- November 5 – Giacomo Villani, catholic Bishop (b. 1605)
- November 12 – Francesco Arrigua, Roman Catholic prelate, Bishop of Nicotera (b. 1615)
- November 17 – Charles de Sainte-Maure, duc de Montausier, French military leader (b. 1610)
- November 27 – Renier Meganck, Flemish painter (b. 1637)
- December 1 – Stephen Greenleaf, American colonial politician (b. 1628)
- December 10 – Francis Morley, English Member of Parliament (b. 1623)
- December 15 – Sir Thomas Allen, 1st Baronet, Baronet of London, in the County of Middlesex (b. 1630)
- December 16 – Louise Elisabeth of Courland, Landgrave of Hesse-Homburg (b. 1646)
- December 19 – Gustaf Düben, Swedish composer (b. 1628)
- December 23 – Sir John Johnston, 3rd Baronet, Scottish army officer and kidnapper (b. 1648)
- December 28 – Tommaso Costa, Italian painter (b. 1634)
- December 30 – Philip Babington, politician (b. 1632)

1691

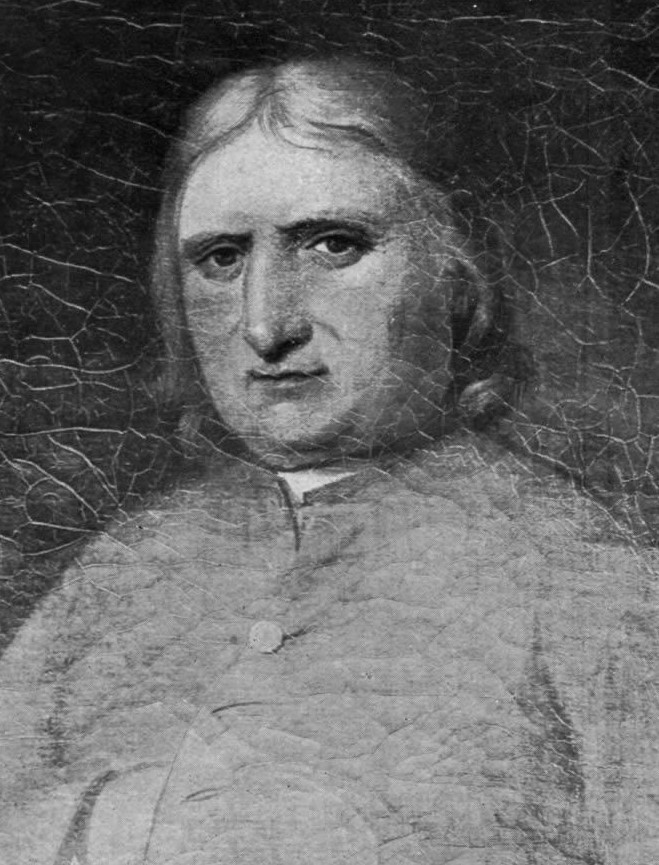
George Fox died 13 January

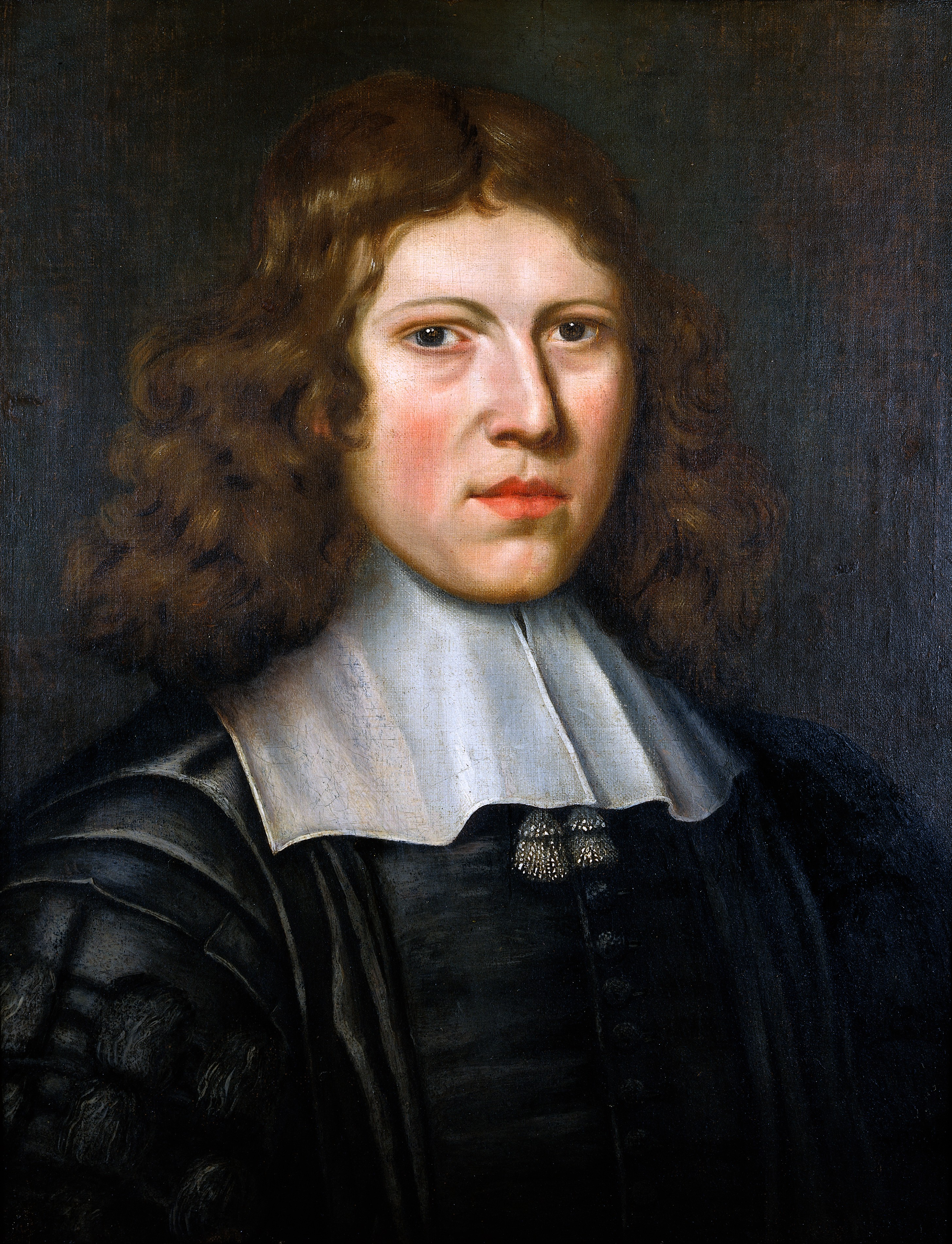
Richard Lower (physician) died 17 January

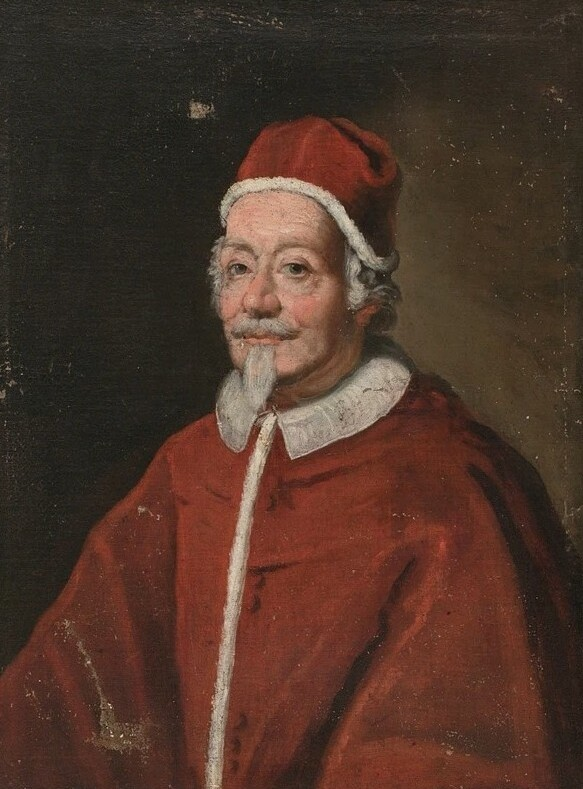
Pope Alexander VIII died 1 February

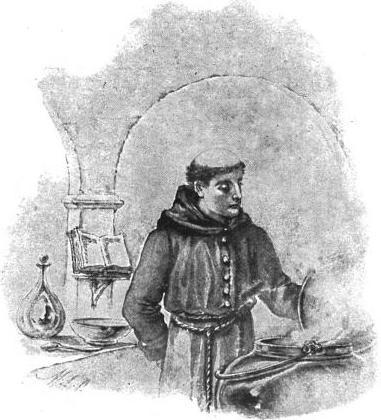
Brother Lawrence died 12 February

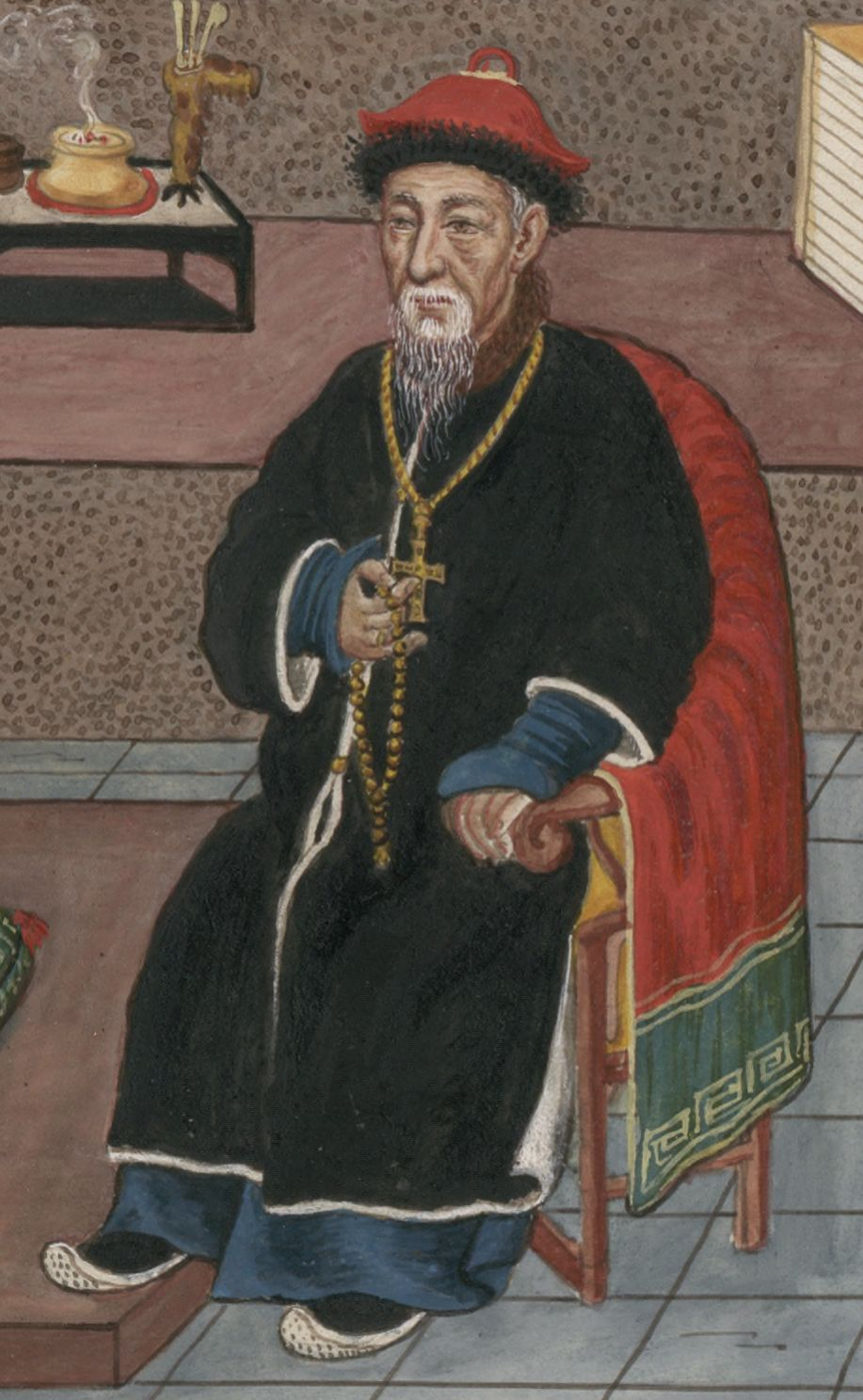
Luo Wenzao died 27 February

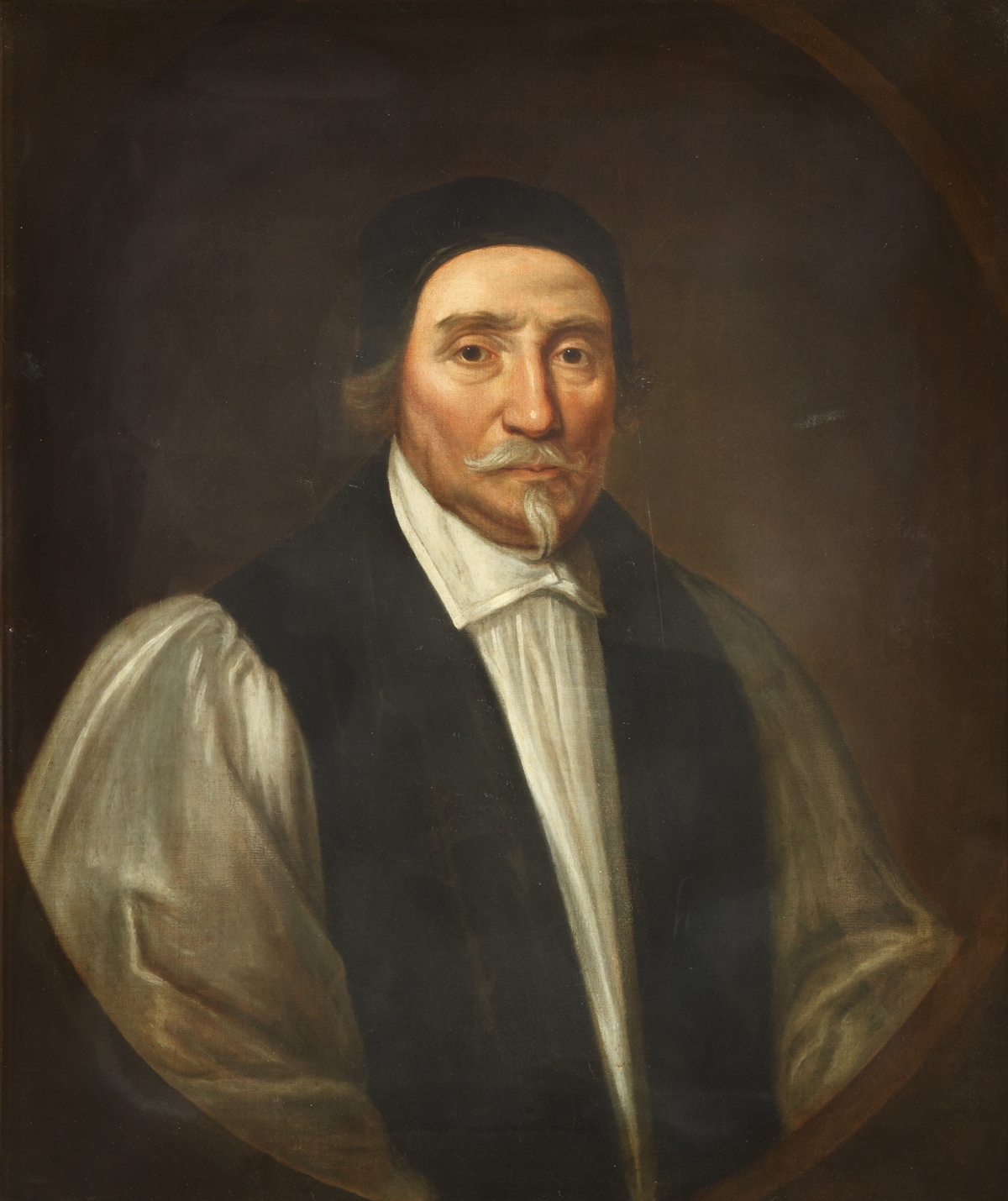
Thomas Lamplugh died 5 May

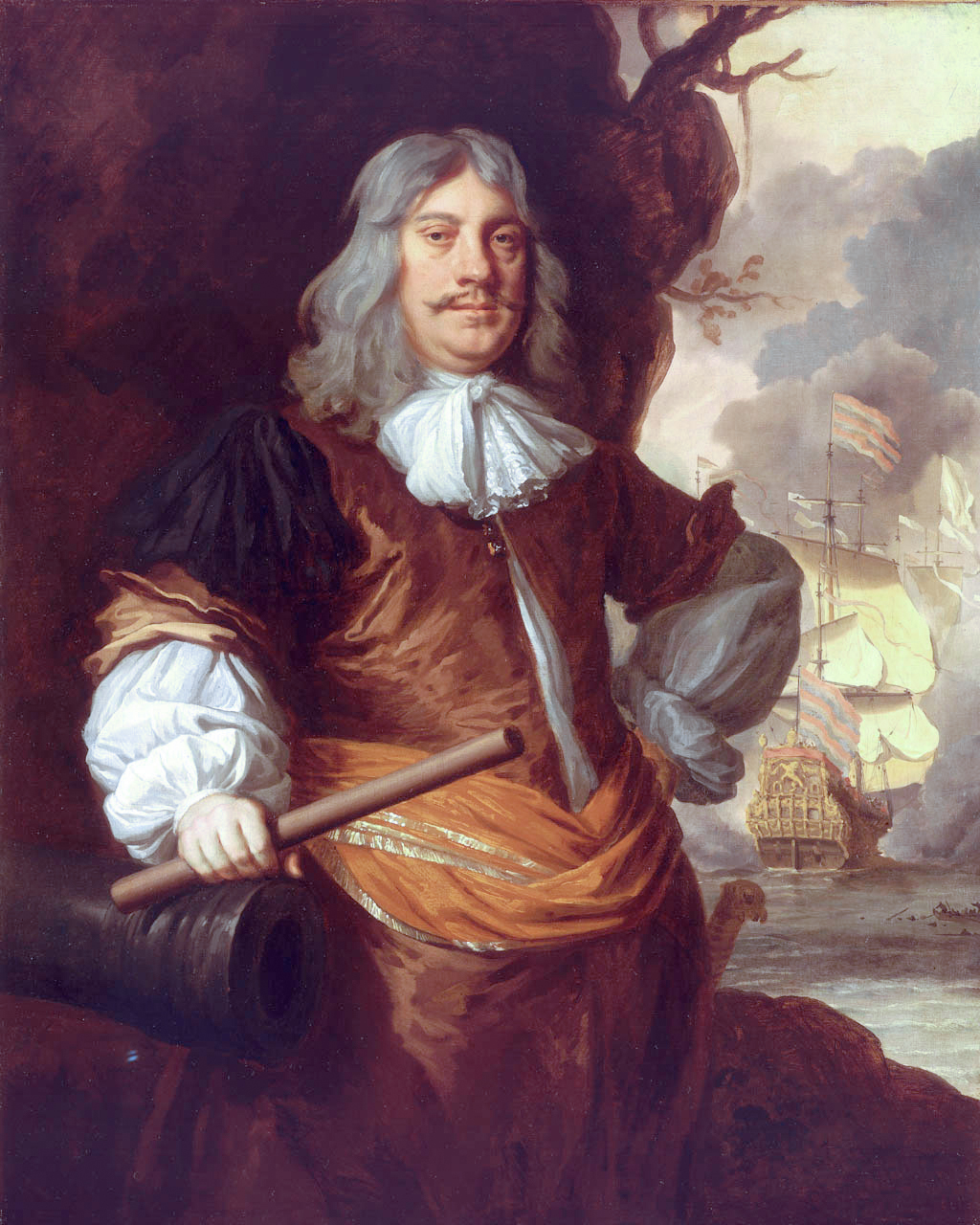
Cornelis Tromp died 29 May

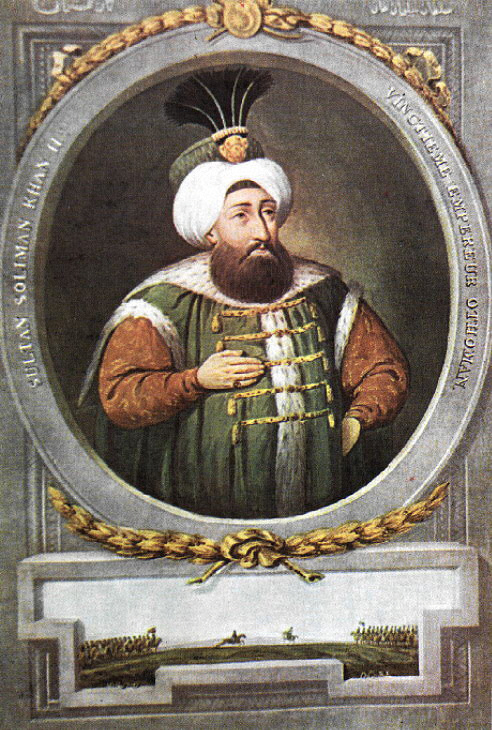
Suleiman II of the Ottoman Empire died 22 June

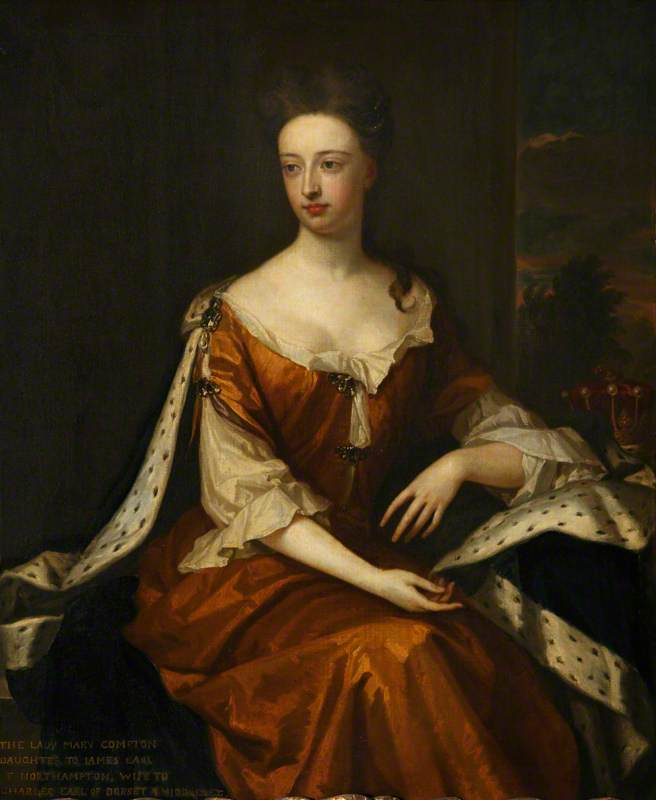
Mary Sackville died 6 August

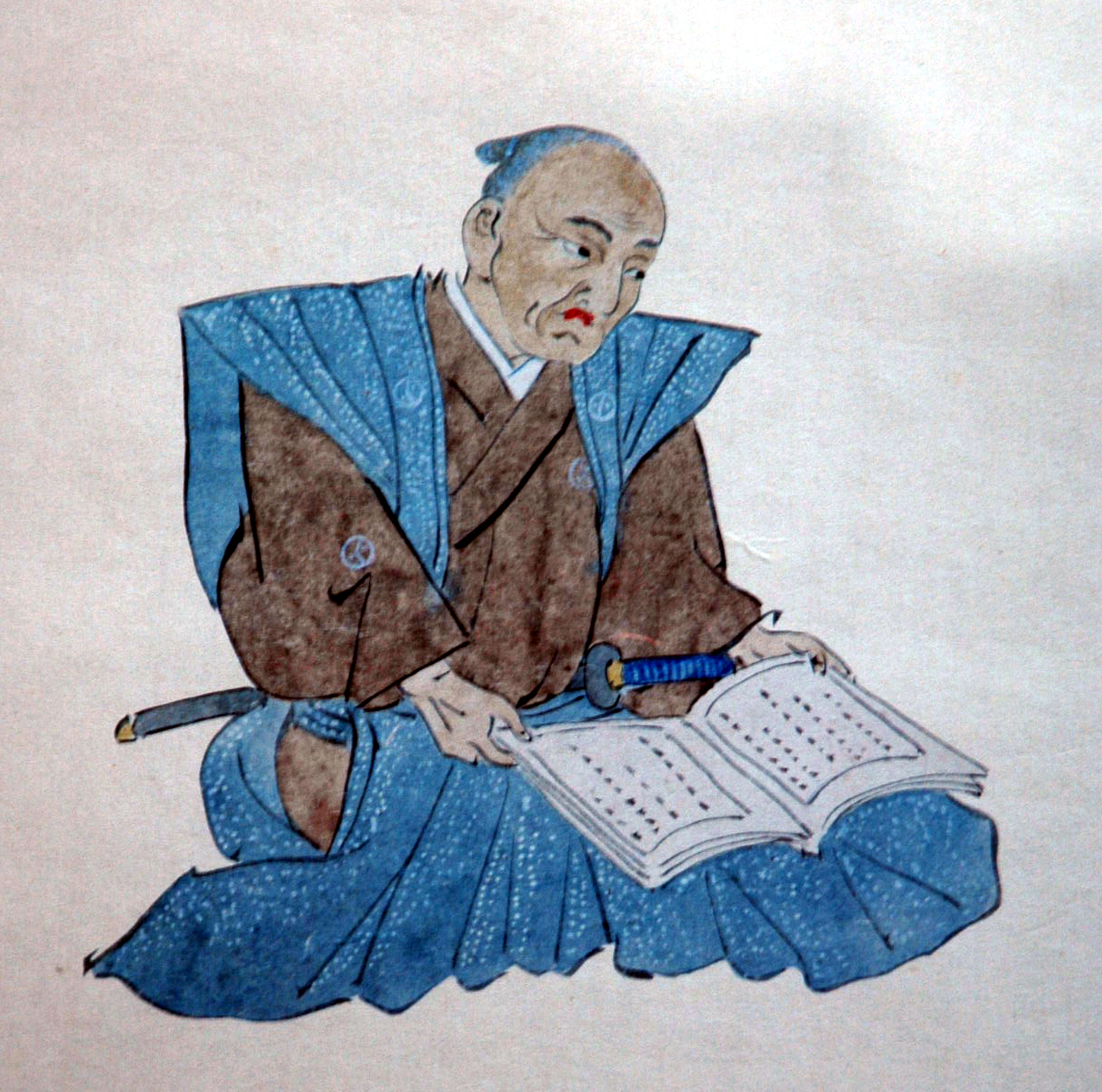
Kumazawa Banzan died 9 September

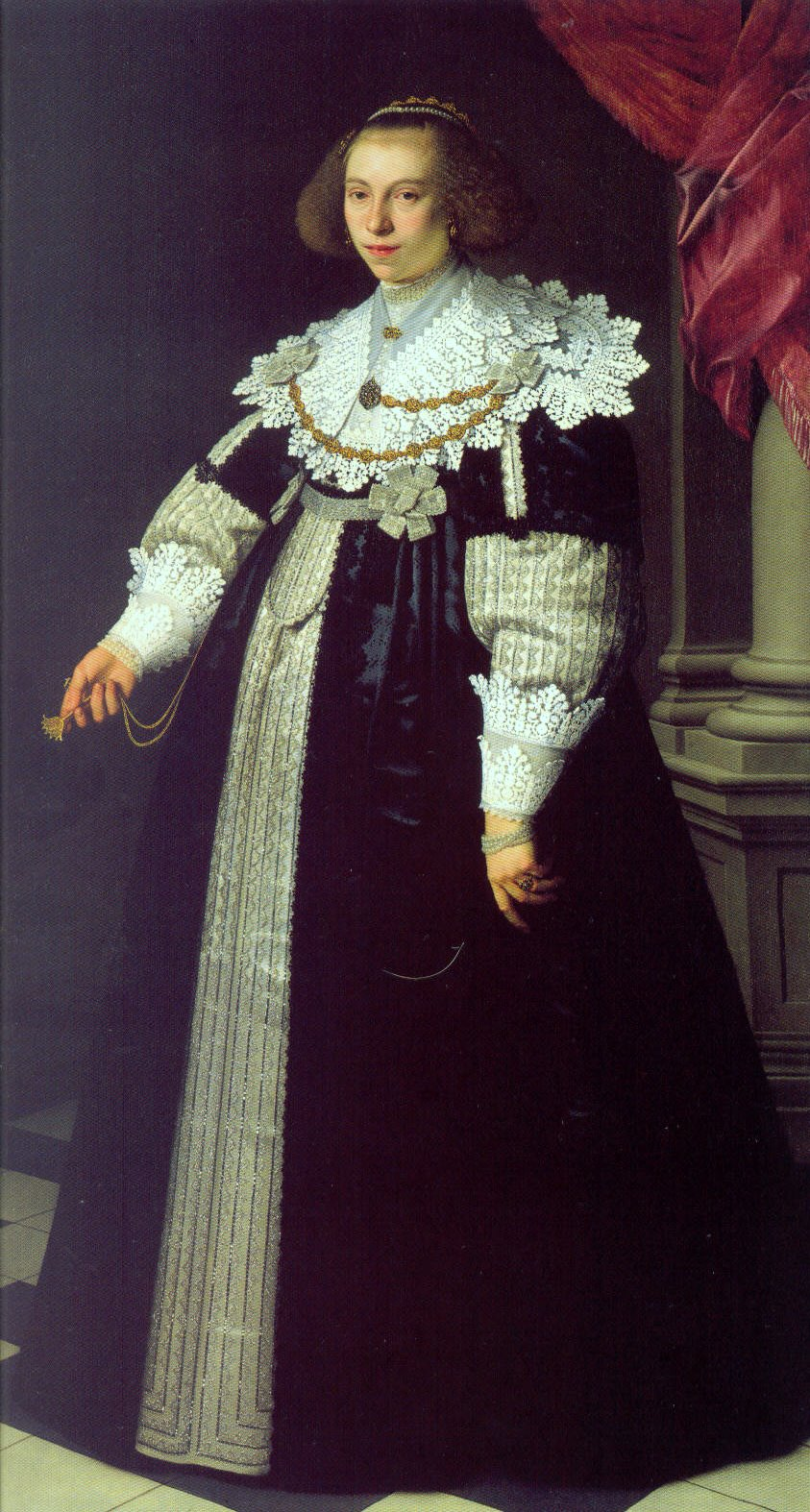
Catharina Hooft died 30 September

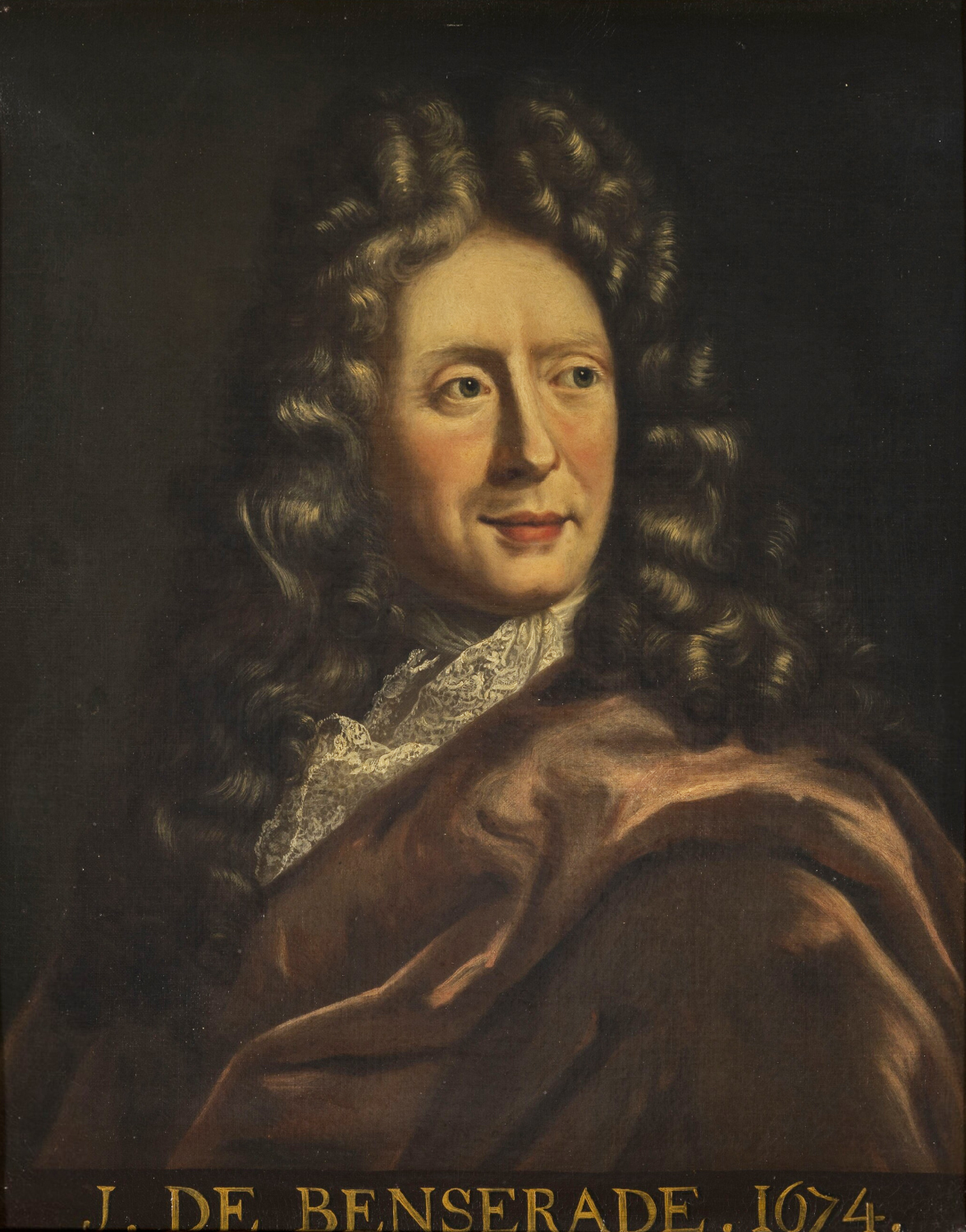
Isaac de Benserade died 10 October

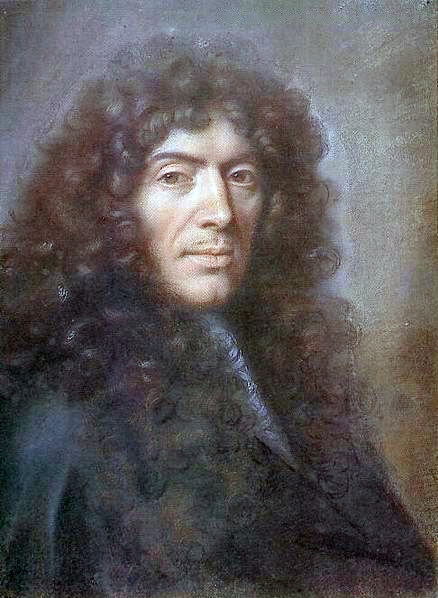
Israel Silvestre died 11 October

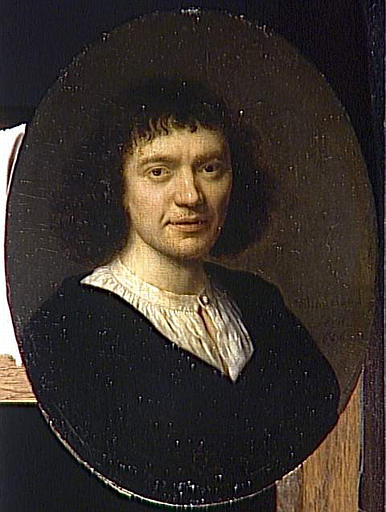
Pieter Cornelisz van Slingelandt died 7 November

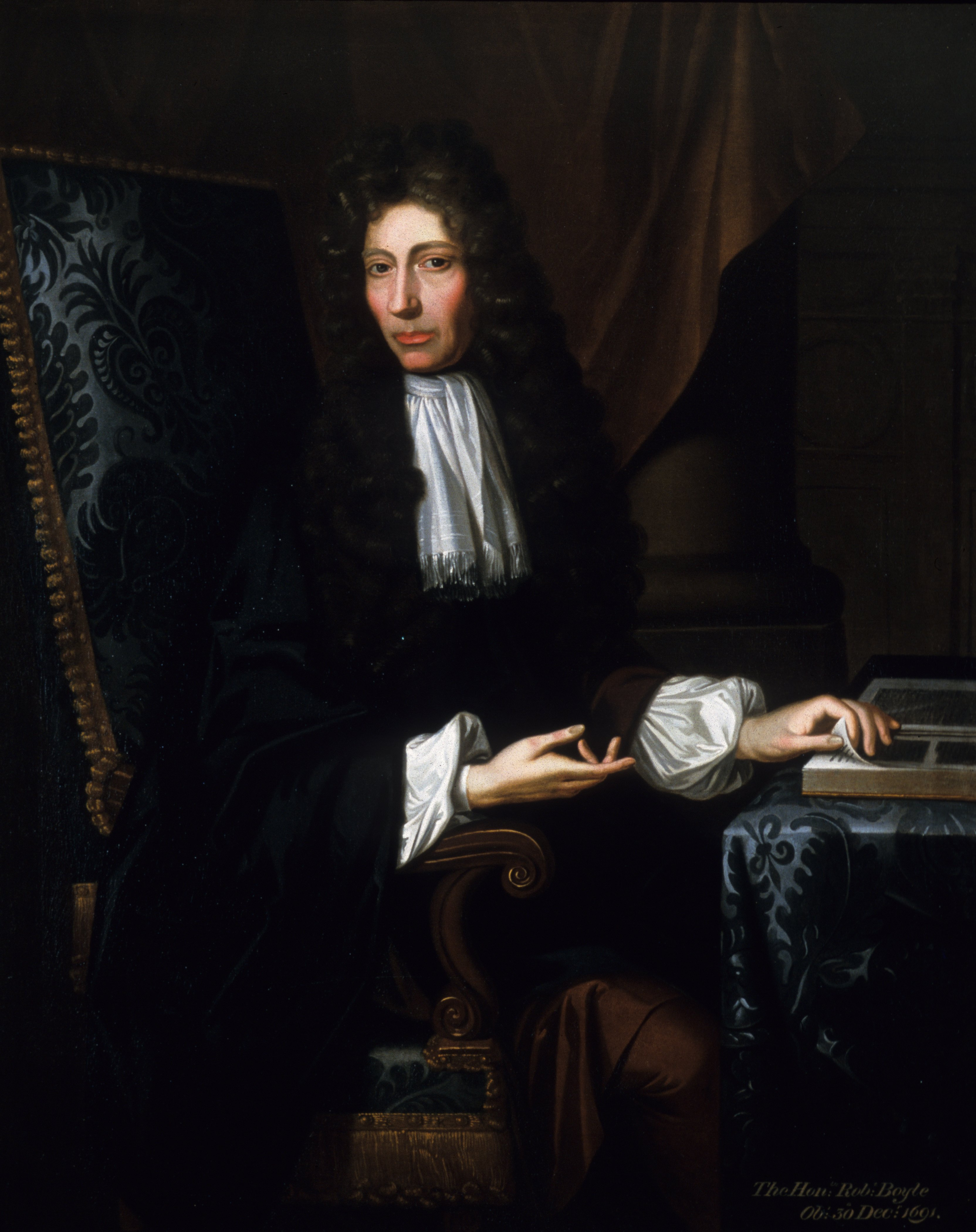
Robert Boyle died 31 December

=== January–March ===
- January 10 – Wolf Caspar von Klengel, German builder, architect and officer (b. 1630)
- January 13 – George Fox, English founder of the Society of Friends (b. 1624)
- January 17 – Richard Lower, English physician (b. 1631)
- January 19 – Giacinto Brandi, Italian painter (b. 1621)
- January 22 – Edward Master, English politician (b. 1610)
- January 23 – William Maurice, Prince of Nassau-Siegen (b. 1649)
- January 24 – James Bishop, English-born 23rd Deputy Governor of Connecticut (b. 1625)
- January 25 – Anthonie Hals, painter from the Northern Netherlands (b. 1621)
- January 28 – John Ashton, English courtier and Jacobite conspirator (b. 1653)
- January 29 – Asai Ryōi, Buddhist priest and writer (b. 1612)
- February 1 – Pope Alexander VIII, pope of the Catholic Church from 1689 to 1691 (b. 1610)
- February 4 – Paul Amman, German botanist and physician (b. 1634)
- February 7 – Nguyễn Phúc Trăn, Vietnamese ruler (b. 1650)
- February 8 – Carlo Rainaldi, Italian architect (b. 1611)
- February 12 – Brother Lawrence, French Christian monk (b. 1614)
- February 19 – Sir Thomas Lee, 1st Baronet, English politician (b. 1635)
- February 20 – Juan Francisco de la Cerda, 8th Duke of Medinaceli, Spanish politician (b. 1637)
- February 21
  - Hans Willem van Aylva, Dutch soldier (b. 1633)
  - Antonio Bichi, Catholic cardinal (b. 1614)
- February 22 – Juan del Vado, Spanish composer (b. 1625)
- February 25 – Antonio de Benavides y Bazán, Roman Catholic patriarch (b. 1610)
- February 27 – Luo Wenzao, First Chinese bishop (b. 1615)
- February 28
  - Joseph Moxon, British hydrographer (b. 1627)
  - Mathias Spieler, Swedish architect (b. 1640)
- March 1 – Sultan Bahu, Punjabi Sufi mystic, poet and scholar (b. 1630)
- March 5 – Jean-Jacques Renouard de Villayer, French postal pioneer (b. 1607)
- March 8 – Gabriel Souart, Canadian priest (b. 1611)
- March 11 – Giulio Spinola, Italian cardinal (b. 1612)
- March 15 – Anna Salome of Manderscheid-Blankenheim, Abbess of Thorn Abbey, later abbess of Essen Abbey (b. 1628)
- March 17 – Thomas Wynne, English personal physician of William Penn (b. 1627)
- March 19 – Nicholas De Mayer, Dutch politician (b. 1635)
- March 29 – Nicolas Talon, French Jesuit (b. 1605)

=== April–June ===
- April 3
  - Antoine Philibert Albert Bailly, Italian bishop of Aosta (b. 1605)
  - Jean Petitot, Swiss enamel painter (b. 1607)
- April 6 – Peyton Ventris, English politician (b. 1645)
- April 13 – Melchor de Navarra, Duke of Palata, Spanish military personnel (b. 1626)
- April 15 – Joachim Feller, German academic (b. 1638)
- April 20 – Raimondo Capizucchi, Italian cardinal (b. 1616)
- April 21
  - Henry Herbert, 4th Baron Herbert of Chirbury, English peer (b. 1640)
  - George Howard, 4th Earl of Suffolk, British Earl (b. 1625)
  - Ralph Knight, English soldier and politician (b. 1610)
- April 23 – Jean-Henri d'Anglebert, French harpsichordist and composer (b. 1629)
- April 27 – Lorenzo Crasso, Italian literary studies scholar and advocate (b. 1623)
- April 30 – Kirill Naryshkin, maternal grandfather of Peter the Great (b. 1623)
- May 5 – Thomas Lamplugh, Archbishop of York, Bishop of Exeter, Dean of Rochester (b. 1615)
- May 6 – Caterina Tarongí, Mallorcan Jewess burned alive by the Inquisition (b. 1646)
- May 10 – John Birch, British politician (b. 1615)
- May 13 – William Faithorne, English artist and engraver (b. 1616)
- May 16
  - John Alford, English politician (b. 1645)
  - Jacob Leisler, Leader of the Leisler Rebellion, de facto governor of New York (b. 1640)
  - Jacob Milborne, American clerk living in the Province of New York who was an ally (b. 1648)
- May 18 – Sir William Talbot, 3rd Baronet, Irish judge and baronet (b. 1640)
- May 23 – Adrien Auzout, French astronomer (b. 1622)
- May 27 – Pierre Allemand, Canadian ships pilot, explorer, and fur-trader (b. 1662)
- May 29 – Cornelis Tromp, Dutch admiral (b. 1629)
- June 7 – William Jephson, English Member of Parliament (b. 1640)
- June 9
  - Lavater brothers, Swiss physician (b. 1611)
  - Charles Maitland, 3rd Earl of Lauderdale, Scottish judge (b. 1620)
- June 15 – Henry Pollexfen, English politician (b. 1632)
- June 22 – Suleiman II of the Ottoman Empire, Sultan of the Ottoman Empire from 1687 to 1691 (b. 1642)
- June 23 – Sir William Gardiner, 1st Baronet, Member of the Parliament of England (b. 1628)
- June 26
  - Anne Chamberlyne, English sailor (b. 1667)
  - John Flavel, English Presbyterian clergyman (b. 1627)

=== July–September ===
- July 3 – Marc'Antonio Pasqualini, Italian opera singer and composer (b. 1614)
- July 10 – Giacinto Platania, Italian painter (b. 1612)
- July 12
  - John Hamilton, Irish military officer of Scottish descent (b. 1650)
  - Marquis de St Ruth, French (killed at the Battle of Aughrim) (b. 1650)
  - Charles Chalmot de Saint-Ruhe, French general (b. 1650)
- July 16 – François-Michel le Tellier, Marquis de Louvois, Secretary of State for War under Louis XIV (b. 1641)
- July 18 – Sir John Bowyer, 2nd Baronet, English politician (b. 1653)
- July 20 – Jacques Frémin, French missionary (b. 1626)
- July 23 – Paul Barillon, French diplomat (b. 1630)
- July 26 – Henry Cavendish, 2nd Duke of Newcastle, English politician (b. 1630)
- July 30 – Daniel Georg Morhof, German writer and scholar (b. 1639)
- August 1 – Marie de Hautefort, French noble (b. 1616)
- August 2 – Frederick I, Duke of Saxe-Gotha-Altenburg (b. 1646)
- August 6
  - João Ferreira de Almeida, pastor (b. 1628)
  - Mary Sackville, Countess of Dorset, English countess (b. 1669)
- August 7
  - Livio Mehus, Flemish painter, draughtsman and engraver (b. 1630)
  - Philip Skippon, English politician and naturalist (b. 1641)
- August 8 – François Verwilt, Dutch Golden Age painter (b. 1620)
- August 11 – Nicolaes van Verendael, Flemish painter (b. 1640)
- August 14 – Richard Talbot, 1st Earl of Tyrconnel, Irish rebel (b. 1630)
- August 18 – François d'Alesso d'Éragny, French soldier, governor general of the French Antilles (b. 1643)
- August 19
  - Köprülüzade Fazıl Mustafa Pasha, Ottoman Grand Vizier (b. 1637)
  - Adam Zrinski, Croatian count and military officer (b. 1662)
- August 22 – Sir Ralph Delaval, 1st Baronet, English landowner and politician (b. 1622)
- August 25 – Philippe Charles d'Arenberg, Duke of Arenberg (b. 1663)
- August 27 – Sir Thomas Norton, 1st Baronet, Member of the Parliament of England (b. 1615)
- September 6 – William Pulteney, Member of Parliament (b. 1624)
- September 9 – Kumazawa Banzan, Japanese philosopher (b. 1619)
- September 10 – Edward Pococke, English orientalist and biblical scholar (b. 1604)
- September 12 – John George III, Elector of Saxony from 1680 to 1691 (b. 1647)
- September 14 – William Hussey, English ambassador to the Ottoman Empire (b. 1642)
- September 15 – Adam Loftus, 1st Viscount Lisburne, Irish noble (b. 1647)
- September 18
  - Charles Fane, 3rd Earl of Westmorland, Member of Parliament and House of Lords (b. 1635)
  - Giovanni Francesco Ginetti, nephew of Cardinal Marzio Ginetti (b. 1626)
- September 19 – Sir Henry Piers, 1st Baronet, Anglo-Irish landowner, soldier, Member of Parliament, Sheriff and antiquarian (b. 1629)
- September 28 – Johannes Fatio, Swiss surgeon (b. 1649)
- September 29 – Johannes Wolfgang von Bodman, Roman Catholic bishop (b. 1651)
- September 30 – Catharina Hooft, wife of Cornelis de Graeff (b. 1618)

=== October–December ===
- October 4
  - Louis Abelly, Catholic bishop (b. 1604)
  - Federico Baldeschi Colonna, Italian Catholic Cardinal (b. 1625)
  - Francisco de Figueroa, Roman Catholic prelate, Bishop of Tropea (b. 1634)
- October 5 – Paul Mignard, French painter and printmaker (b. 1639)
- October 8 – Thomas Barlow, English academic and clergyman, Provost of The Queen's College, Oxford and Bishop of Lincoln (b. 1607)
- October 9 – William Sacheverell, English politician (b. 1638)
- October 10
  - Isaac de Benserade, French writer (b. 1613)
  - Nicholas Gassaway, Colonel, Maryland Provincial Forces (b. 1634)
- October 11 – Israel Silvestre, French topographical etcher (b. 1621)
- October 18 – Christian I, Duke of Saxe-Merseburg, German noble (b. 1615)
- October 21 – Alexander Seton, 1st Viscount of Kingston, Scottish Royalist (b. 1620)
- October 25 – George Legge, 1st Baron Dartmouth, English naval commander (b. 1647)
- October 30
  - Hermann of Baden-Baden, Imperial field marshal and president of the Hofkriegsrat (b. 1628)
  - Henry Maurice, Welsh priest (b. 1647)
- November 7 – Pieter Cornelisz van Slingelandt, Dutch Golden Age painter (b. 1640)
- November 14 – Tosa Mitsuoki, Japanese painter (b. 1617)
- November 15 – Aelbert Cuyp, Dutch landscape painter (b. 1620)
- November 18 – Sir John Brookes, 1st Baronet, Member of Parliament (b. 1635)
- December – Louis de Vanens, French alchemist and poisoner (b. 1647)
- December 1
  - Thomas Brand, English minister (b. 1635)
  - Louis Henri de Pardaillan de Gondrin, French noble (b. 1640)
- December 8
  - Richard Baxter, English Puritan church leader, poet, and hymn-writer (b. 1615)
  - Michel Le Clerc, French lawyer, dramatist and playwright (b. 1622)
- December 15 – Hendrik van Rheede, Dutch botanist (b. 1637)
- December 23 – Katherine Jones, Viscountess Ranelagh, Anglo-Irish scientist (b. 1615)
- December 31
  - Robert Boyle, Anglo-Irish natural philosopher, chemist, physicist, and inventor (b. 1627)
  - Dudley North, English economist, merchant and politician (b. 1641)
- date unknown
  - Bárbara Coronel, Spanish stage actress (b. 1632)
  - Mariyam Kaba'afa'anu Rani Kilege, queen mother and regent of the Maldives
- probable – Elizabeth Polwheele, English playwright (b. c. 1651)

1692

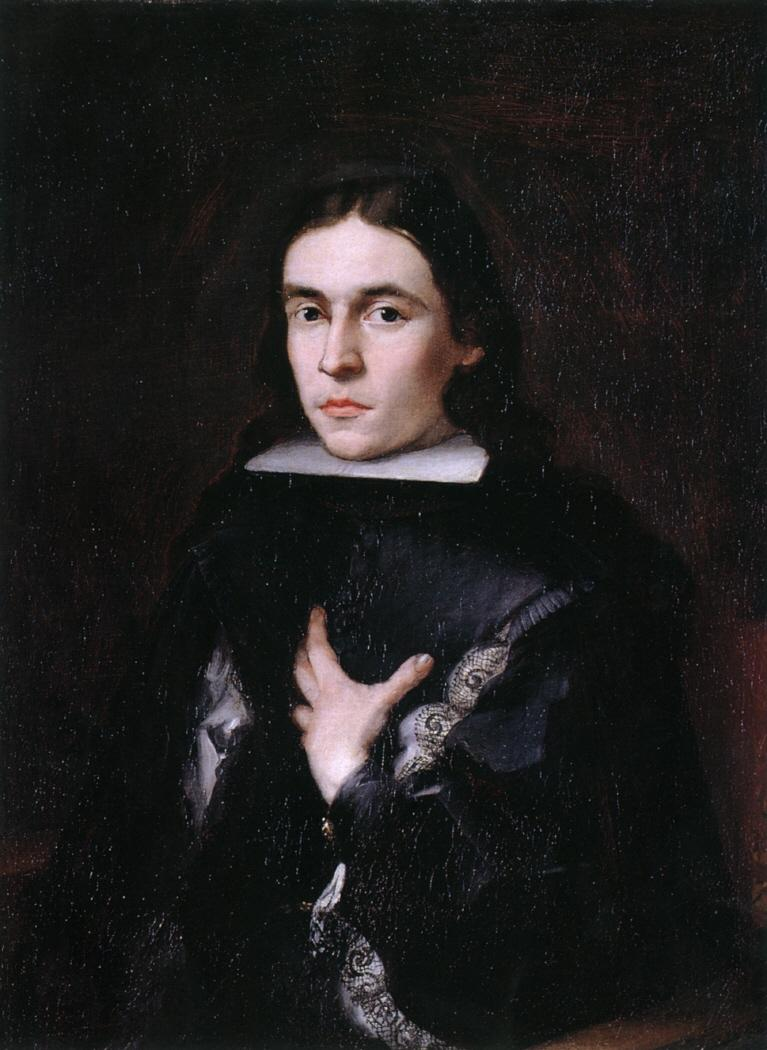
Fernando de Valenzuela, 1st Marquis of Villasierra died 7 January

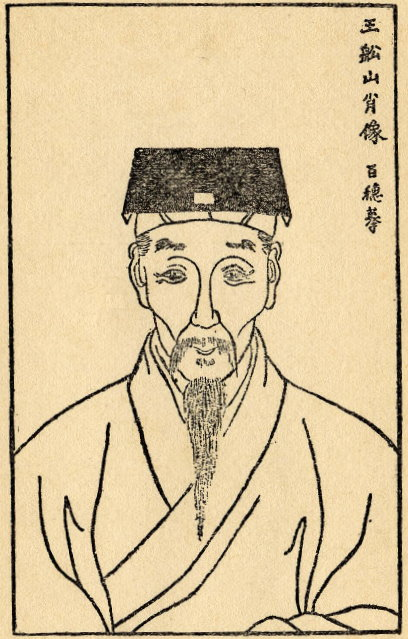
Wang Fuzhi died 18 February

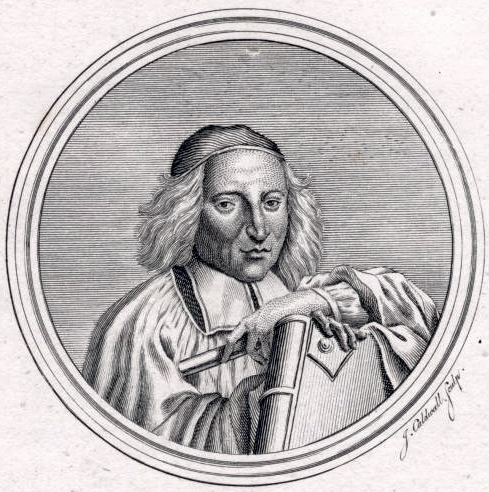
Antimo Liberati died 24 February

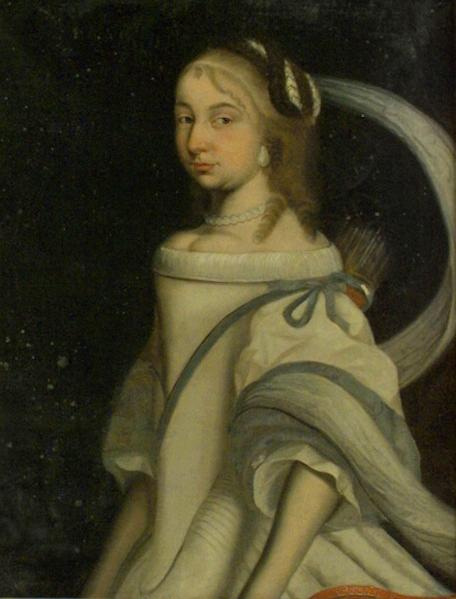
Countess Palatine Eleonora Catherine of Zweibrücken died 3 March

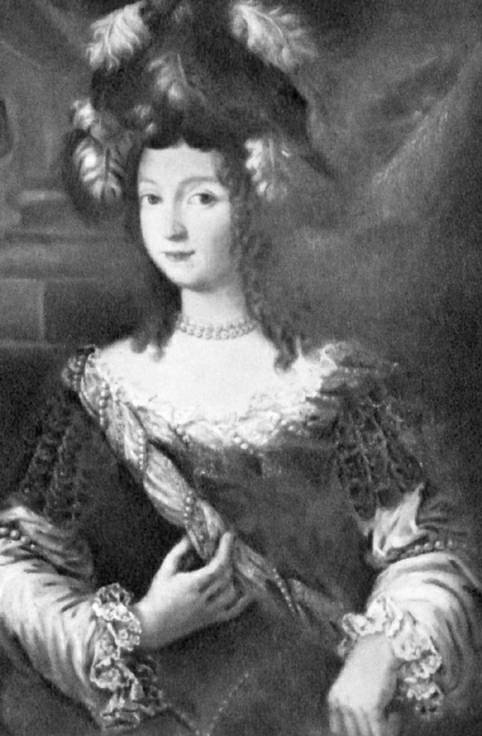
Princess Luisa Cristina of Savoy died 12 May

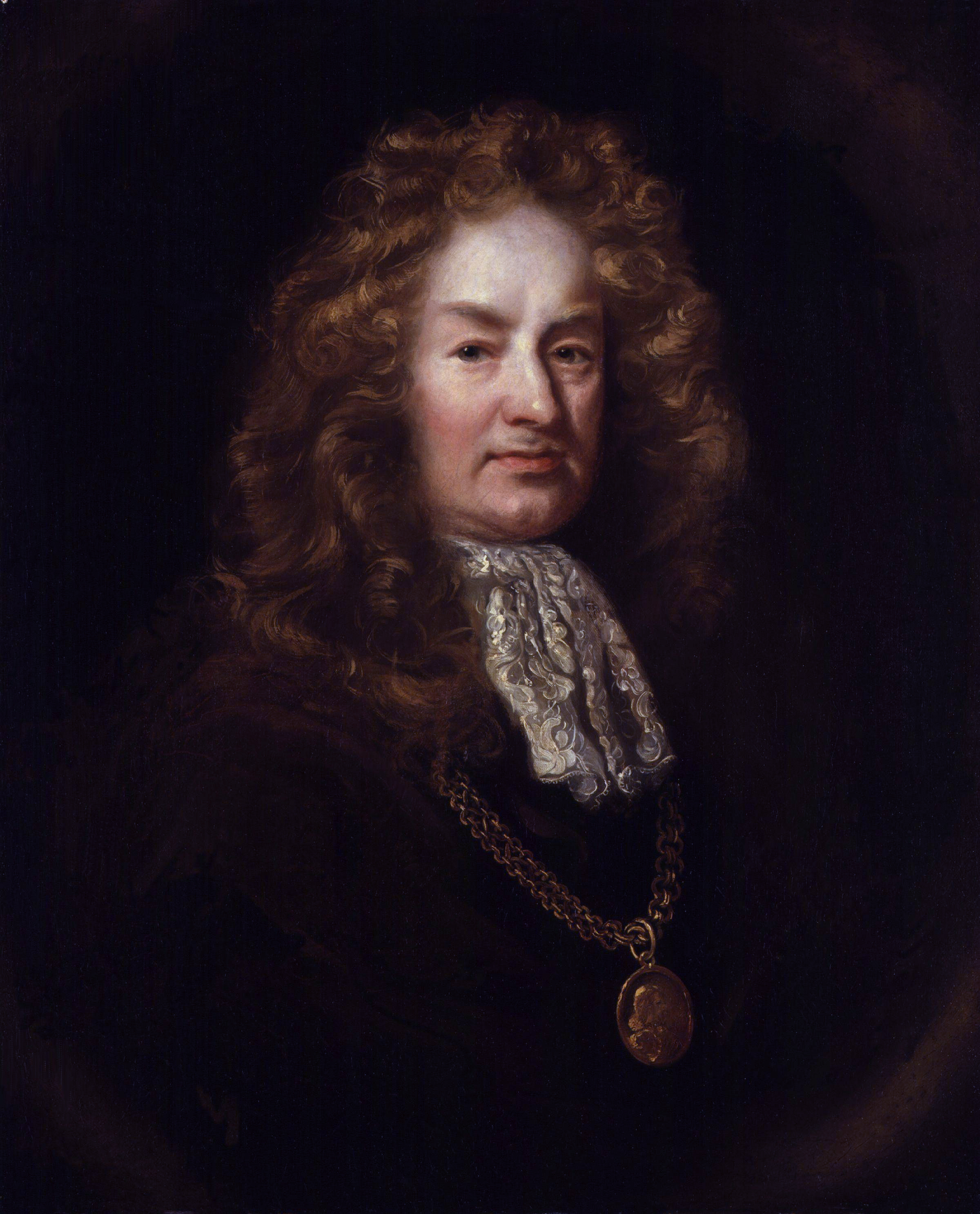
Elias Ashmole died 18 May

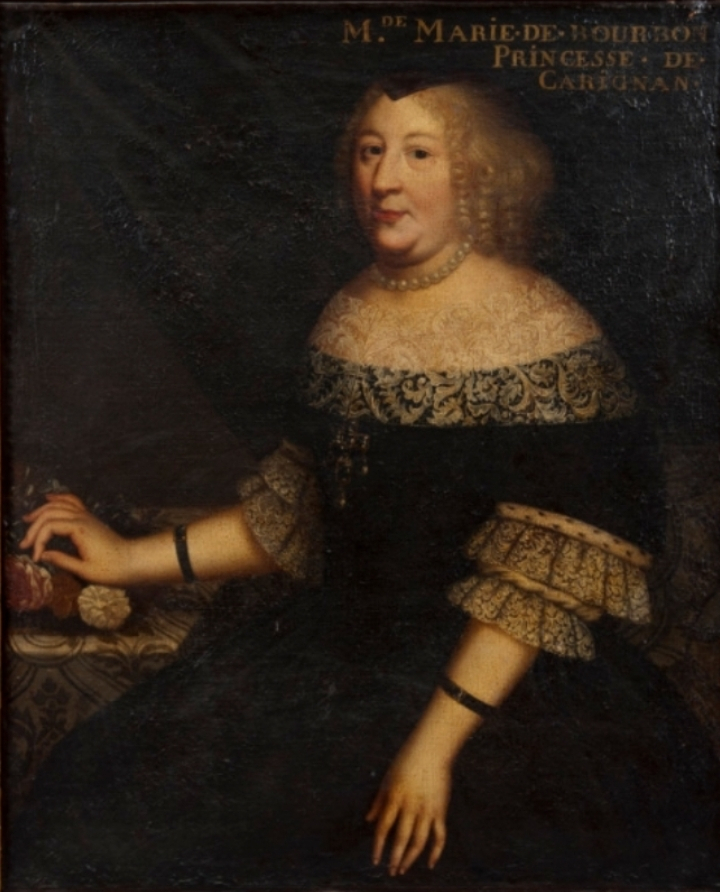
Marie de Bourbon, Countess of Soissons died 3 June

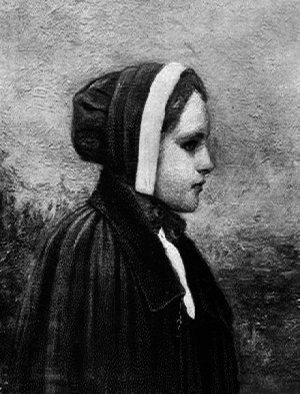
Bridget Bishop died 10 June

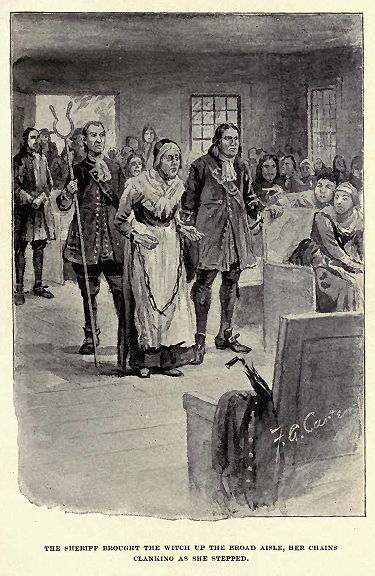
Rebecca Nurse died 19 July

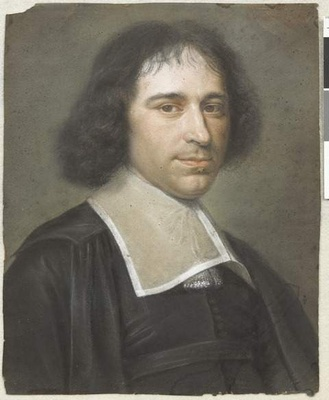
Gilles Ménage died 23 July

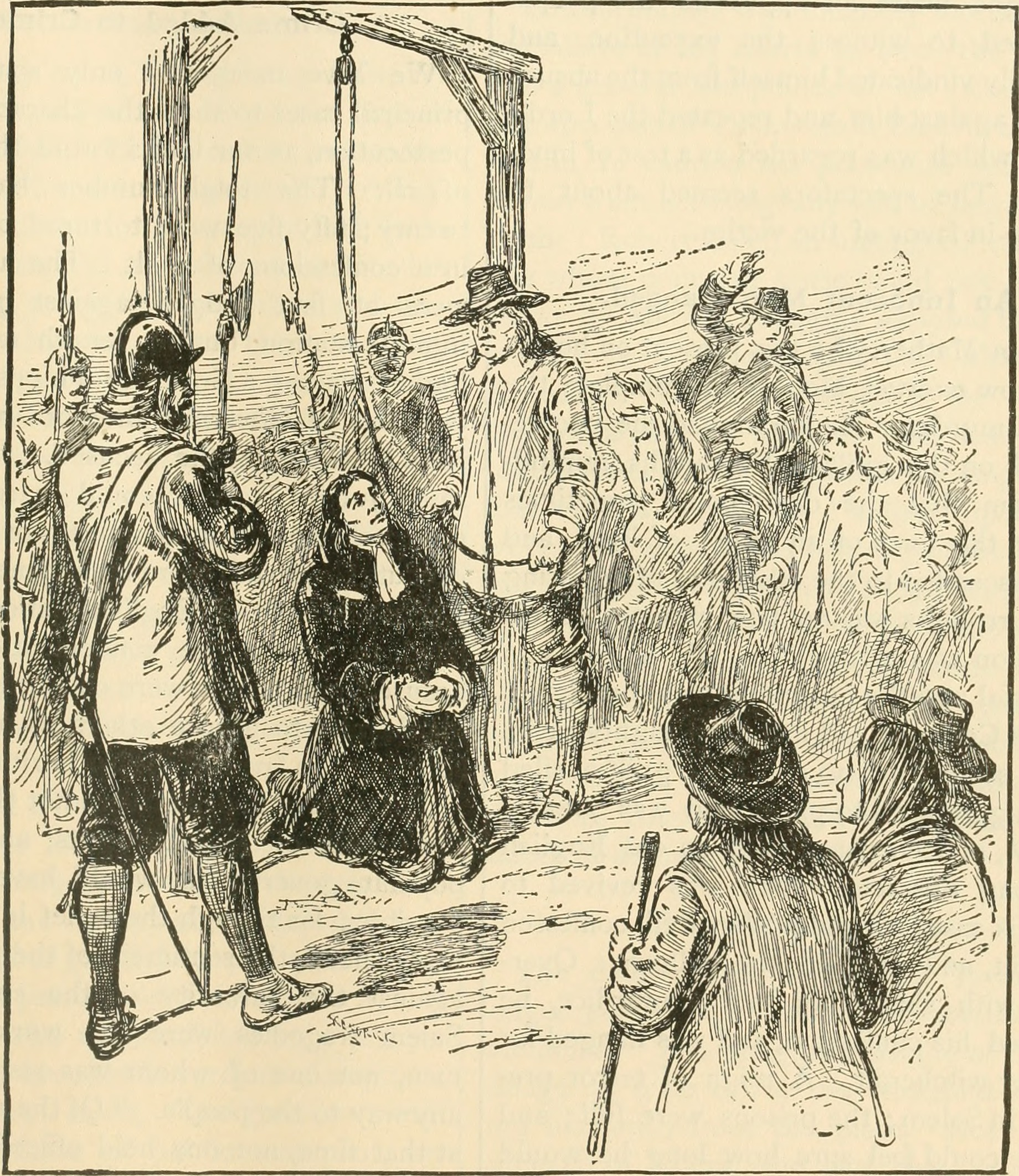
George Burroughs died 19 August

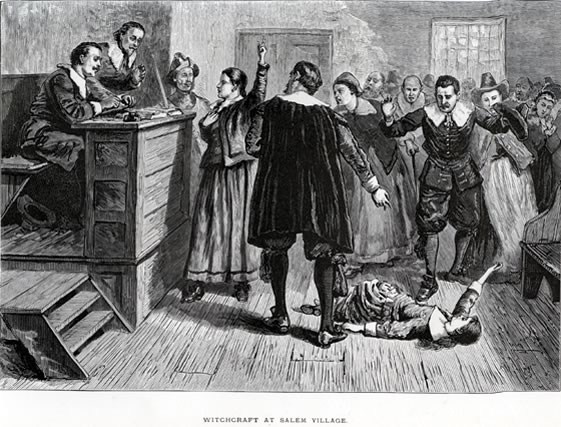
Martha Carrier (Salem witch trials) died 19 August

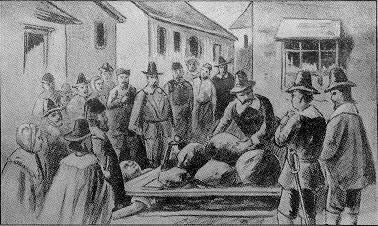
Giles Corey died 19 September

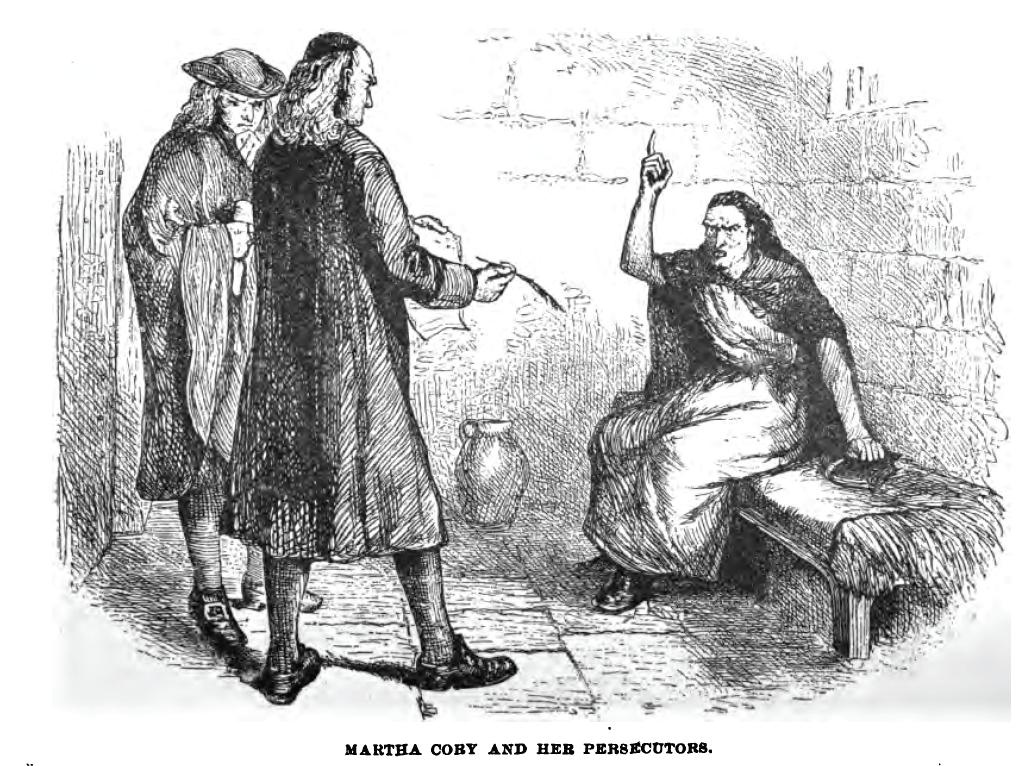
Martha Corey died 22 September

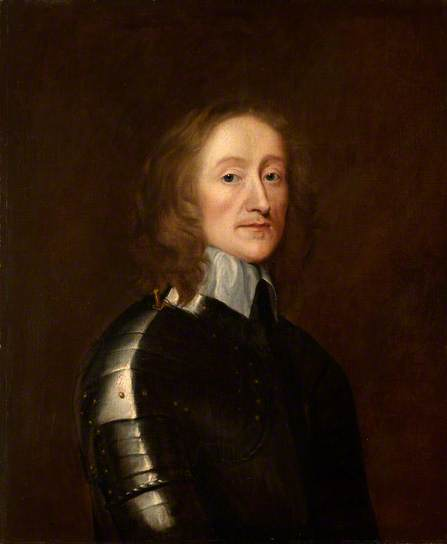
Charles Fleetwood died 4 October

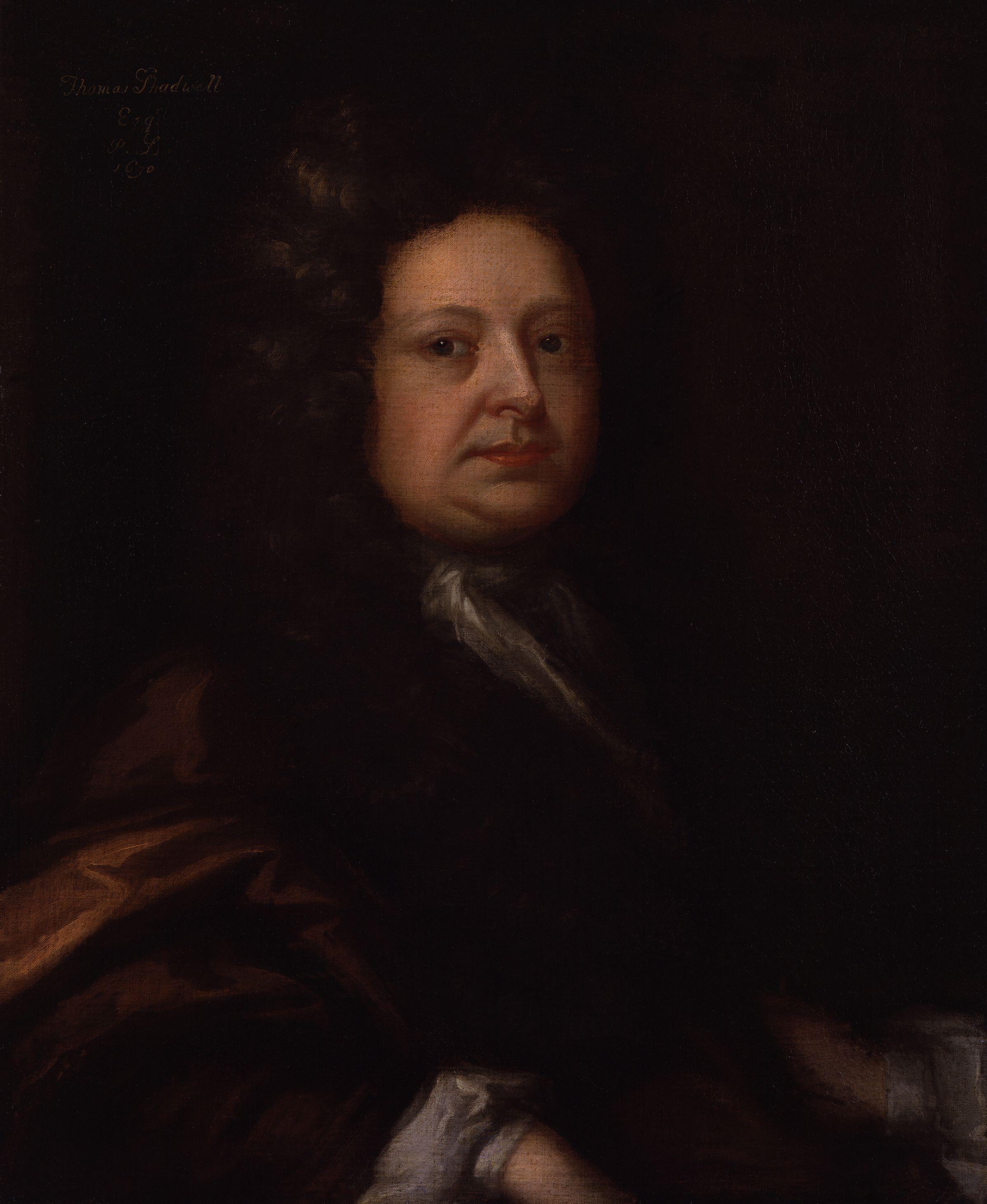
Thomas Shadwell died 19 November

John Russell (clergyman) died 10 December

=== January–March ===
- January 3 – Roelant Roghman, painter and engraver from the Northern Netherlands (b. 1627)
- January 4
  - Paul Colomiès, French librarian (b. 1638)
  - Jean Crasset, French theologian (b. 1618)
  - Thomas Hog, parish minister (b. 1628)
  - Rombaut Pauwels, Flemish sculptor (b. 1625)
- January 7 – Fernando de Valenzuela, 1st Marquis of Villasierra, Spanish noble (b. 1636)
- January 8 – Robert Lichton, Swedish count, lieutenant-general and statesman (b. 1631)
- January 11 – Thomas Bilson, English Member of Parliament (b. 1655)
- January 16
  - William O'Brien, 2nd Earl of Inchiquin, Irish nobleman (b. 1640)
  - Thomas Wynne, Welsh-American physician and politician (b. 1627)
- January 19 – Jan Commelin, Dutch botanist (b. 1629)
- January 22
  - Sir James Long, 2nd Baronet, English politician; (b. 1617)
  - Lewis Owen, Welsh politician (b. 1622)
- January 23 – John Page, Virginian planter, merchant and politician (b. 1627)
- January 25 – Shubael Dummer, American Congregational church minister (b. 1636)
- January 27 – Thomas Grove, English politician (b. 1609)
- January 28 – Henry Bull, English lawyer and politician (b. 1630)
- February 3 – Jane Granville, Countess of Bath (b. 1630)
- February 4 – Francesco Niccolini, apostolic nuncio (b. 1639)
- February 5 – Joshua Brooksbank, Church of Ireland priest (b. 1642)
- February 6 – George Durant, attorney in the Province of Carolina (b. 1632)
- February 8 – Matthias Tanner, Czech baroque writer, religious writer and Roman Catholic priest (b. 1630)
- February 9 – Sir Coplestone Bampfylde, 2nd Baronet, English politician (b. 1637)
- February 11 – Anders Paulsen, Sami noaidi (b. 1600)
- February 12 – Hendrick Hamel, Dutch journalist (b. 1630)
- February 14 – Thomas Rosewell, English nonconformist minister convicted of treason (b. 1630)
- February 15 – Thomas Mun, English politician, Member of Parliament (b. 1645)
- February 16 – David Lloyd, Welsh biographer, born 1635 (b. 1635)
- February 18 – Wang Fuzhi, Chinese essayist, historian and philosopher (b. 1619)
- February 23 – Bartholomeus Eggers, Flemish sculptor (b. 1637)
- February 24 – Antimo Liberati, Italian composer (b. 1617)
- March 1 – La Grange, French actor (b. 1635)
- March 3 – Countess Palatine Eleonora Catherine of Zweibrücken, sister of King Charles X of Sweden (b. 1626)
- March 7 – Henry Muddiman, English journalist (b. 1629)
- March 9 – Willem de Heusch, Dutch painter (b. 1625)
- March 13 – Augustine Reding, Swiss abbot and theologian (b. 1625)

=== April–June ===
- April 2 – Sir John Lauder, 1st Baronet, Scottish noble (b. 1595)
- April 5 – Tomás Carbonell, Roman Catholic bishop (b. 1620)
- April 6 – Emmanuel Schelstrate, Belgian theologian (b. 1649)
- April 14 – Carlos de Aragón de Gurrea, 9th Duke of Villahermosa, Spanish nobleman, viceroy and governor (b. 1634)
- April 17 – Abraham-César Lamoureux, French sculptor who worked mainly in Sweden and Denmark (b. 1640)
- April 22
  - Tomás de la Cerda, 3rd Marquess of la Laguna de Camero Viejo, Spanish nobleman (b. 1638)
  - Jean Le Noir, theologian (b. 1622)
- April 23
  - Giuseppe Eusanio, Roman Catholic prelate, Titular Bishop of Porphyreon (b. 1619)
  - Edward Howard, 2nd Earl of Carlisle, English politician (b. 1646)
  - Pieter Withoos, painter from the Northern Netherlands (b. 1655)
  - Johannes Zollikofer, Swiss vicar (b. 1633)
- April 30 – Kim Man-jung, Korean novelist and politician (b. 1637)
- May 3 – Edward Evelyn, British politician (b. 1626)
- May 4 – Charles III, Duke of Elbeuf, French noble (b. 1620)
- May 6 – Nathaniel Lee, English dramatist (b. 1653)
- May 9 – Albrecht of Saxe-Weissenfels, German prince (b. 1659)
- May 12 – Princess Luisa Cristina of Savoy, Princess of Savoy (b. 1629)
- May 14 – Robert Kirk, Scottish folklorist, Bible translator, Gaelic scholar (b. 1644)
- May 18 – Elias Ashmole, English antiquarian (b. 1617)
- May 21 – John Jones, English merchant and politician (b. 1610)
- May 31
  - Anthony Aucher, English politician (b. 1614)
  - Nicholas Dennys, English politician (b. 1616)
  - Michele Foscarini, Italian historian (b. 1632)
  - Thomas Jones, English politician and judge (b. 1614)
- June 3 – Marie de Bourbon, Countess of Soissons, wife of Thomas Francis (b. 1606)
- June 7 – Pierre Bailloquet, Jesuit missionary to the Canadian Indians (b. 1612)
- June 8 – Henri Arnauld, French bishop (b. 1597)
- June 9 – Rebecca Rawson, Massachusetts heroine of the 1849 book Leaves from Margaret Smith's Journal (b. 1656)
- June 10 – Bridget Bishop, woman executed for witchcraft during Salem witch trials (b. 1632)
- June 18 – Michelangelo Falvetti, Italian composer (b. 1642)
- June 21 – Christian Louis I, Duke of Mecklenburg-Schwerin (b. 1623)
- June 23 – Gerard Langbaine, English dramatic biographer and critic (b. 1656)

=== July–September ===
- July 7 – Eusébio de Matos, Brazilian orator, religious and painter (b. 1629)
- July 10 – Heinrich Bach, German organist and composer (b. 1615)
- July 14 – Patrick Russell, Irish bishop (b. 1629)
- July 19
  - Mercy Good, accused of witchcraft in the Salem witch trials (b. 1653)
  - Sarah Good, accused of witchcraft in the Salem witch trials (b. 1653)
  - Elizabeth Howe, one of the accused in the Salem witch trials (b. 1635)
  - Susannah Martin, woman executed for witchcraft (b. 1621)
  - Rebecca Nurse, convicted of witchcraft during the Salem witch trials (b. 1621)
  - Sarah Wildes, Salem "witch" (b. 1627)
- July 22 – Pietro del Pò, Italian painter (b. 1616)
- July 23 – Gilles Ménage, French scholar (b. 1613)
- July 31 – William Harbord, British politician (b. 1635)
- August 1 – Sir John Carew, 3rd Baronet, Member of Parliament of England (b. 1635)
- August 3
  - James Douglas, Earl of Angus, Scottish nobleman and soldier (b. 1671)
  - Frederick, Duke of Schleswig-Holstein-Sonderburg-Augustenburg, German nobleman (b. 1652)
- August 4 – Jean-Michel-d'Astorg Aubarède, Vicar Capitular of Pamiers (b. 1639)
- August 12 – Nathaniel Colburn, early settler and selectman in Dedham (b. 1611)
- August 14 – Nicolas Chorier, French historian, lawyer and writer (b. 1612)
- August 19
  - George Burroughs, American pastor convicted of witchcraft (b. 1652)
  - Martha Carrier, executed for withcraft (b. 1650)
  - George Jacobs, English Colonist during the Salem Witch Trials (b. 1609)
  - John Proctor, convicted of witchcraft during the Salem Witch Trials (b. 1632)
  - John Willard, Salem Witch (b. 1657)
- August 23 – Randall Holden, colonial Rhode Island settler (b. 1612)
- August 24 – William Stewart, 1st Viscount Mountjoy, Anglo-Irish peer and soldier (b. 1653)
- August 25 – Aleijda Wolfsen, painter from the Northern Netherlands (b. 1648)
- September 3 – David Ancillon, French Huguenot pastor and author (b. 1617)
- September 4 – Claus Røyem, Dano-Norwegian civil servant and government official (b. 1638)
- September 6 – Hartvig Asche von Schack (b. 1644)
- September 15 – César Vichard de Saint-Réal, French polyglot (b. 1639)
- September 19 – Giles Corey, Massachusetts farmer and accused wizard (b. 1611)
- September 21 – Ermes di Colorêt, Italian poet, political figure (b. 1622)
- September 22
  - Martha Corey, convicted of being a witch during the 1692 Salem witch trials (b. 1619)
  - Mary Eastey, woman executed in the Salem witch trials (b. 1634)
  - Mary Parker, Massachusetts colony member accused of witchcraft (b. 1637)
  - Margaret Scott, hanged as part of the Salem witch trials (b. 1615)
  - Samuel Wardwell, hanged as part of the Salem witch trials (b. 1643)
- September 28 – Cornelis Bloemaert, Dutch painter (b. 1603)

=== October–December ===
- October 1 – Diego de Aguilar, Spanish bishop (b. 1616)
- October 2 – Ann Pudeator, woman executed in the Salem witch trials (b. 1621)
- October 4 – Charles Fleetwood, English Parliamentarian soldier and politician, Lord Deputy of Ireland (b. 1618)
- October 5
  - David Atwater, American colonist (b. 1615)
  - Alfonso Bernardo de los Ríos y Guzmán, archbishop of Granada (b. 1626)
- October 12 – Giovanni Battista Vitali, Italian composer (b. 1632)
- October 15 – Johannes Maximus Stainer von Pleinfelden, Roman Catholic prelate, Auxiliary Bishop of Passau (b. 1610)
- October 16 – Christian Albert, Margrave of Brandenburg-Ansbach (b. 1675)
- October 23 – Alexander von Spaen, German general (b. 1619)
- October 25 – Jasper Schade van Westrum, Dutch representative to the States-General (b. 1623)
- October 27 – Anna Mikhailovna of Russia (b. 1630)
- October 29 – Melchisédech Thévenot, French scientist (b. 1620)
- October 30 – William Bentney, English priest (b. 1609)
- November 2 – Thomas Rudyard, American politician (b. 1640)
- November 10 – Gédéon Tallemant des Réaux, French writer (b. 1619)
- November 13
  - Mary Browne, courtier (b. 1593)
  - Joseph de la Vega, Jewish Hispano-Dutch merchant, poet, and philanthropist (b. 1650)
- November 14 – Christoph Bernhard, German composer (b. 1628)
- November 16 – Theodore Poulakis, Greek artist (b. 1622)
- November 18
  - Robert Holmes, British Royal Navy Admiral (b. 1622)
  - Christopher Nevile, English politician (b. 1631)
- November 19
  - Thomas Shadwell, English poet and playwright (b. 1642)
  - Prince Georg Friedrich of Waldeck, Dutch general and German field marshal (b. 1620)
- November 21 – Henry Powle, English politician (b. 1630)
- November 22 – Giovanni Battista Centurione, politician (b. 1603)
- November 26
  - Sir John Fowell, 3rd Baronet, English politician (b. 1665)
  - Edmund Ludlow, English politician, soldier and regicide (1617–92) (b. 1617)
- December 5
  - Jacques Bizard, Canadian politician (b. 1642)
  - Aldegonde Desmoulins, Belgian nun (b. 1611)
- December 6 – John Tyrrell, Royal Navy officer (b. 1646)
- December 7 – Richard Meggot, English churchman, Canon of Windsor and Dean of Winchester (b. 1632)
- December 9 – William Mountfort, English actor and dramatist (b. c. 1664)
- December 10 – John Russell, Anglo-American clergyman (b. 1626)
- December 13
  - Conyers Darcy, 2nd Earl of Holderness, English politician (b. 1622)
  - Henry Mildmay, English politician (b. 1619)
- December 15 – Georg Adam Struve, German judge (b. 1619)
- December 16 – Antonio Carneo, Italian painter (b. 1637)
- December 18 – Veit Ludwig von Seckendorff, German politician (b. 1626)
- December 24 – Maria Antonia of Austria, Archduchess of Austria (b. 1669)

1693

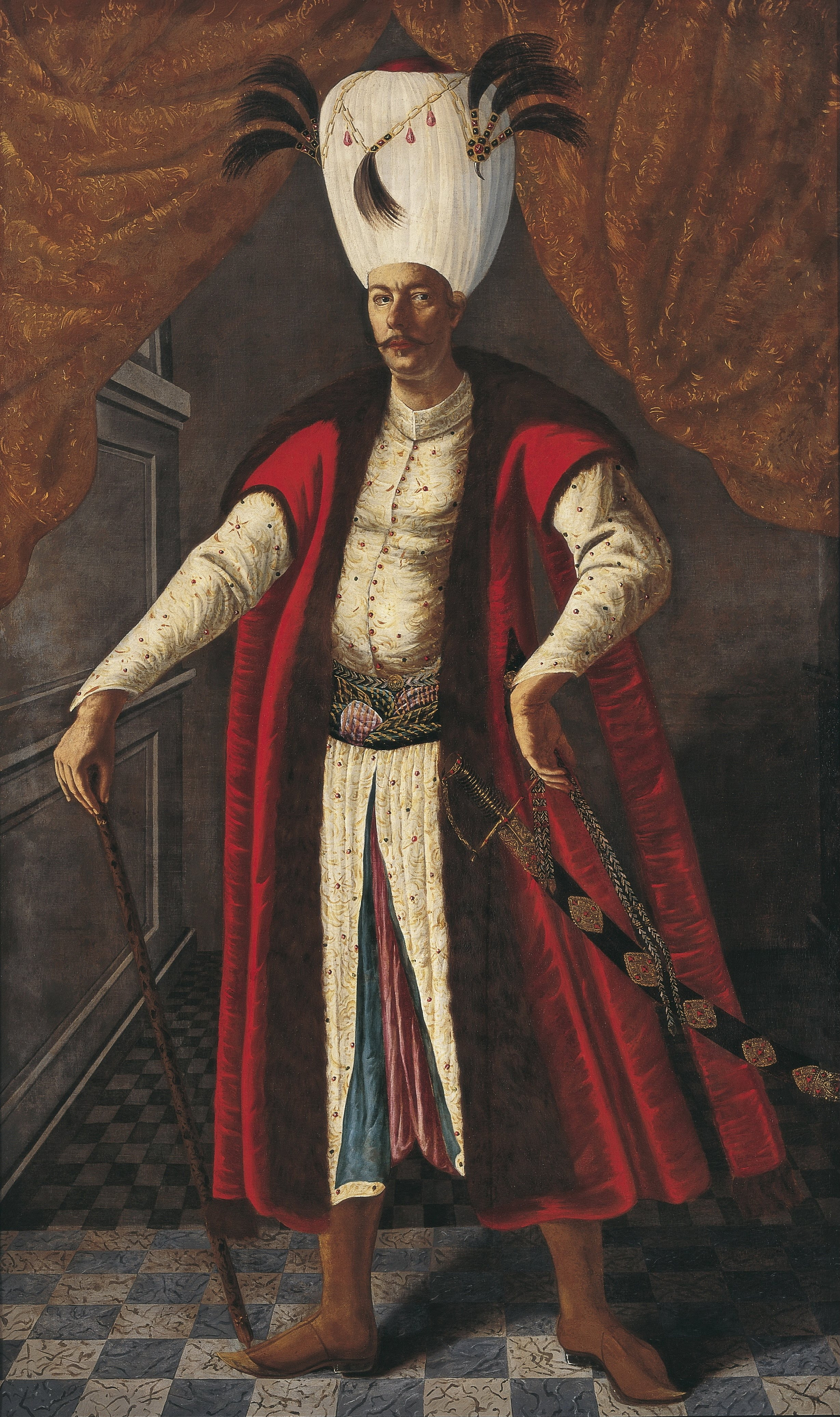
Mehmed IV died 6 January

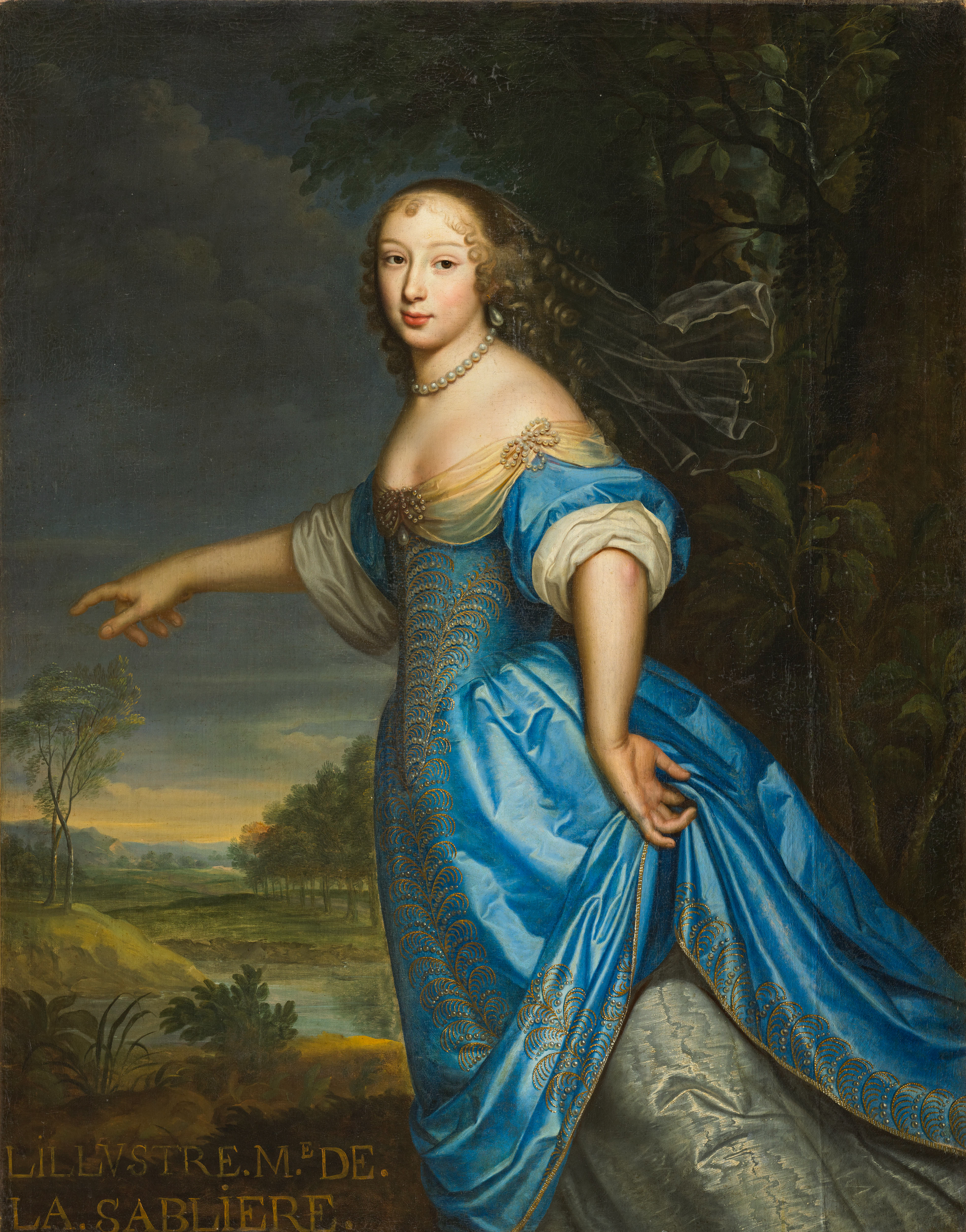
Marguerite de la Sablière died 6 January

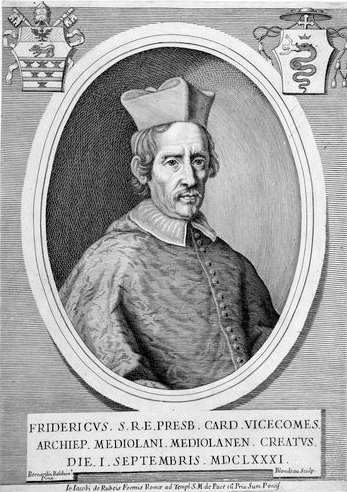
Federico Visconti died 7 January

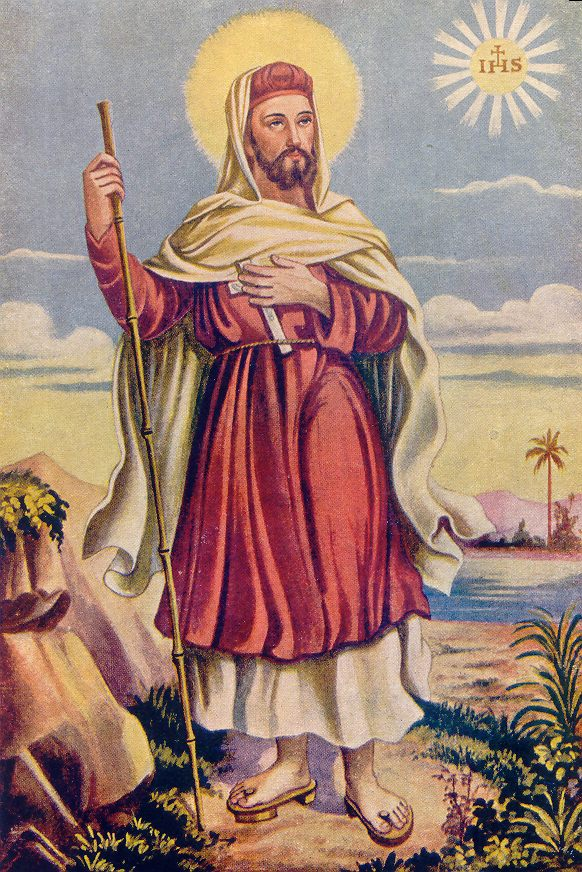
John de Britto died 4 February

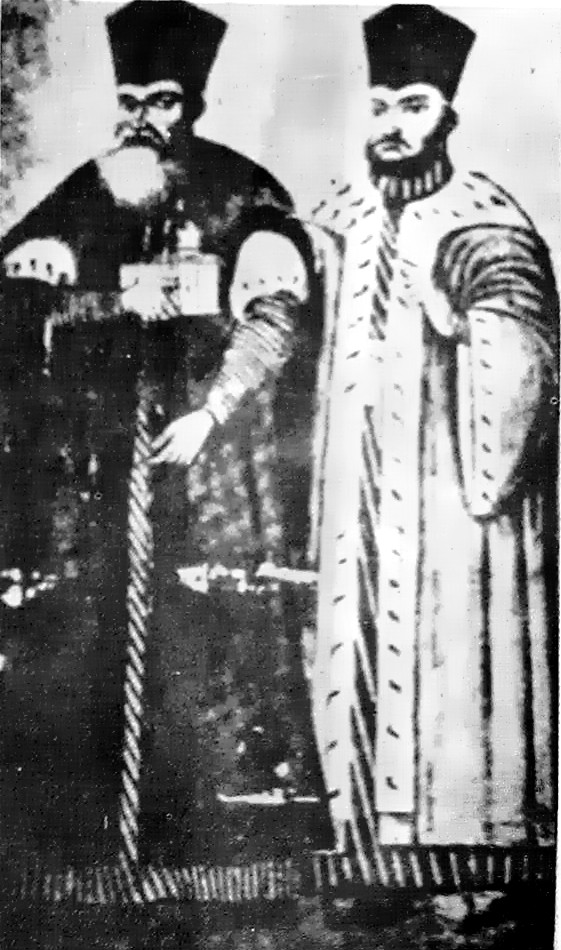
Constantin Cantemir died 24 March

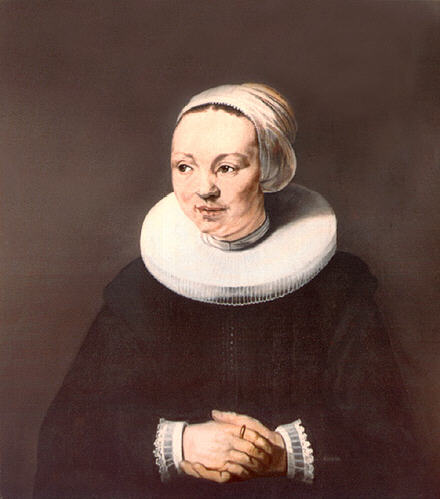
Adriaantje Hollaer died 31 March

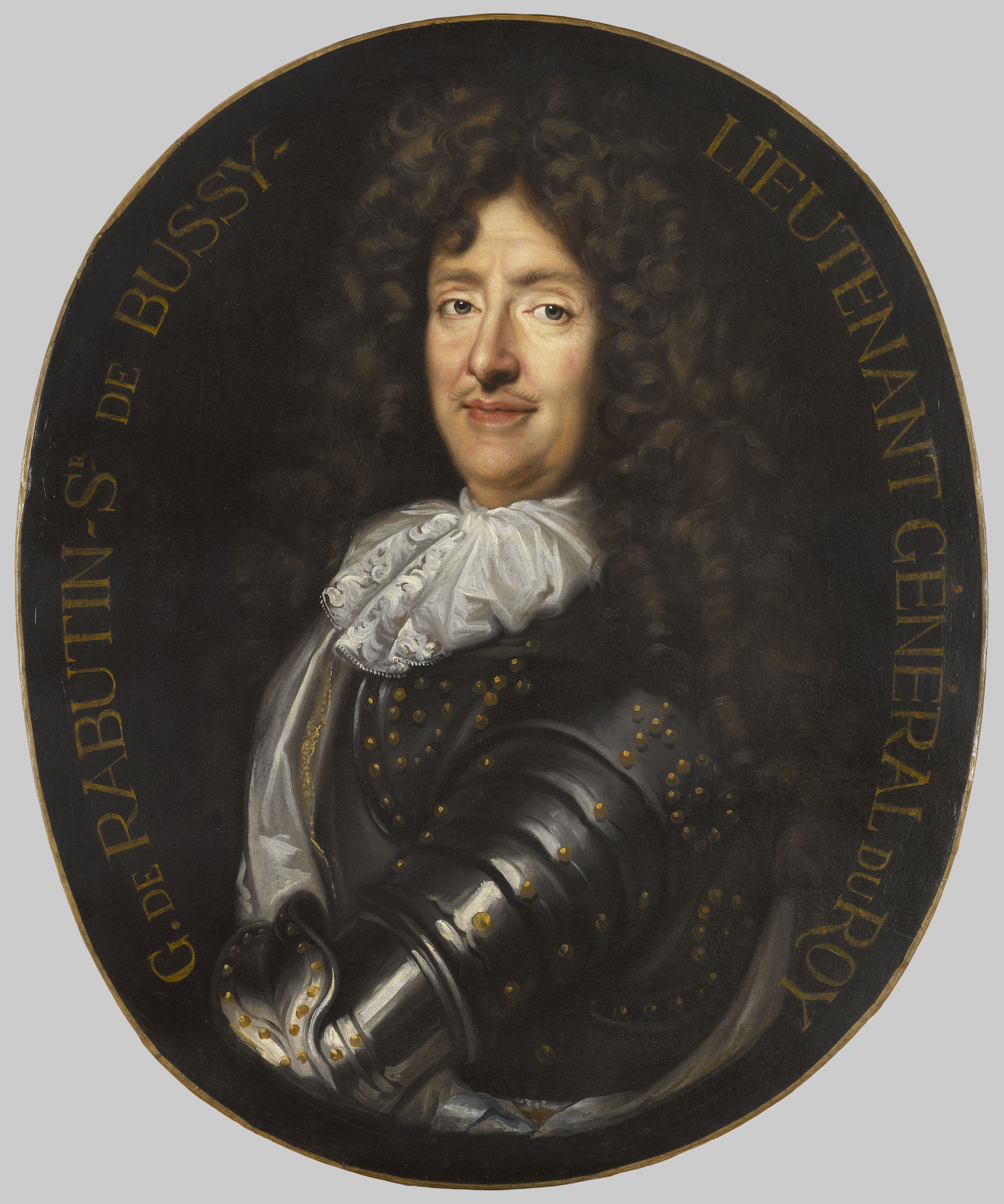
Roger de Rabutin, comte de Bussy died 9 April

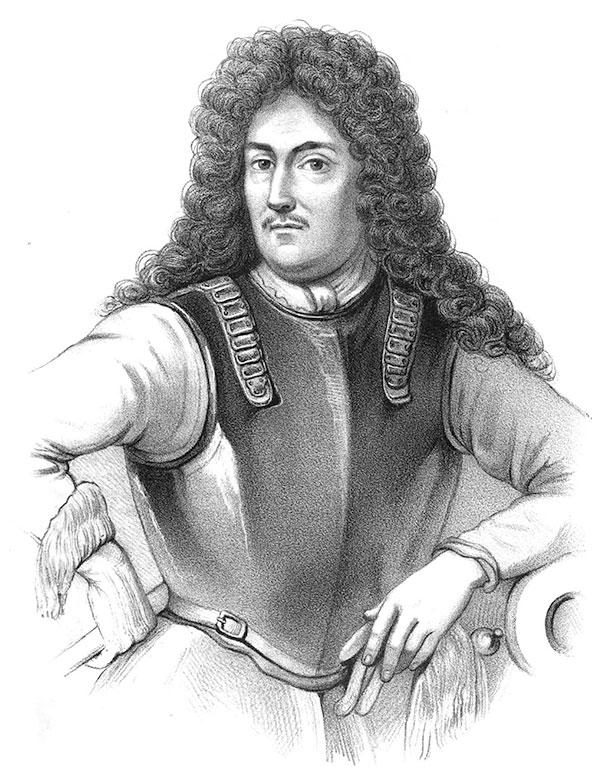
Rutger von Ascheberg died 17 April

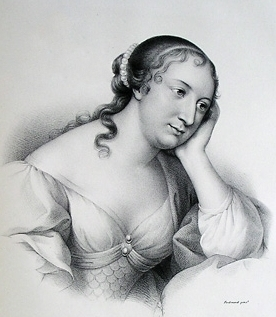
Madame de La Fayette died 25 May

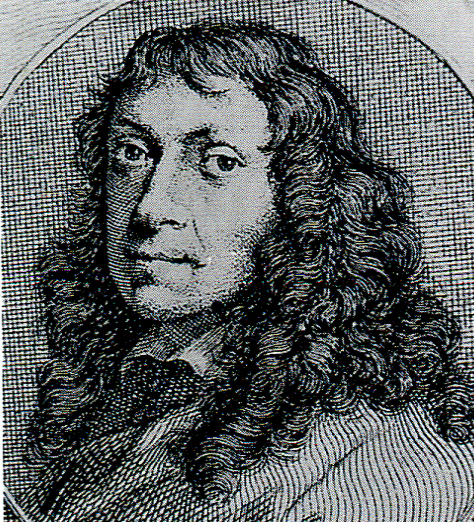
Willem Kalf died 31 July

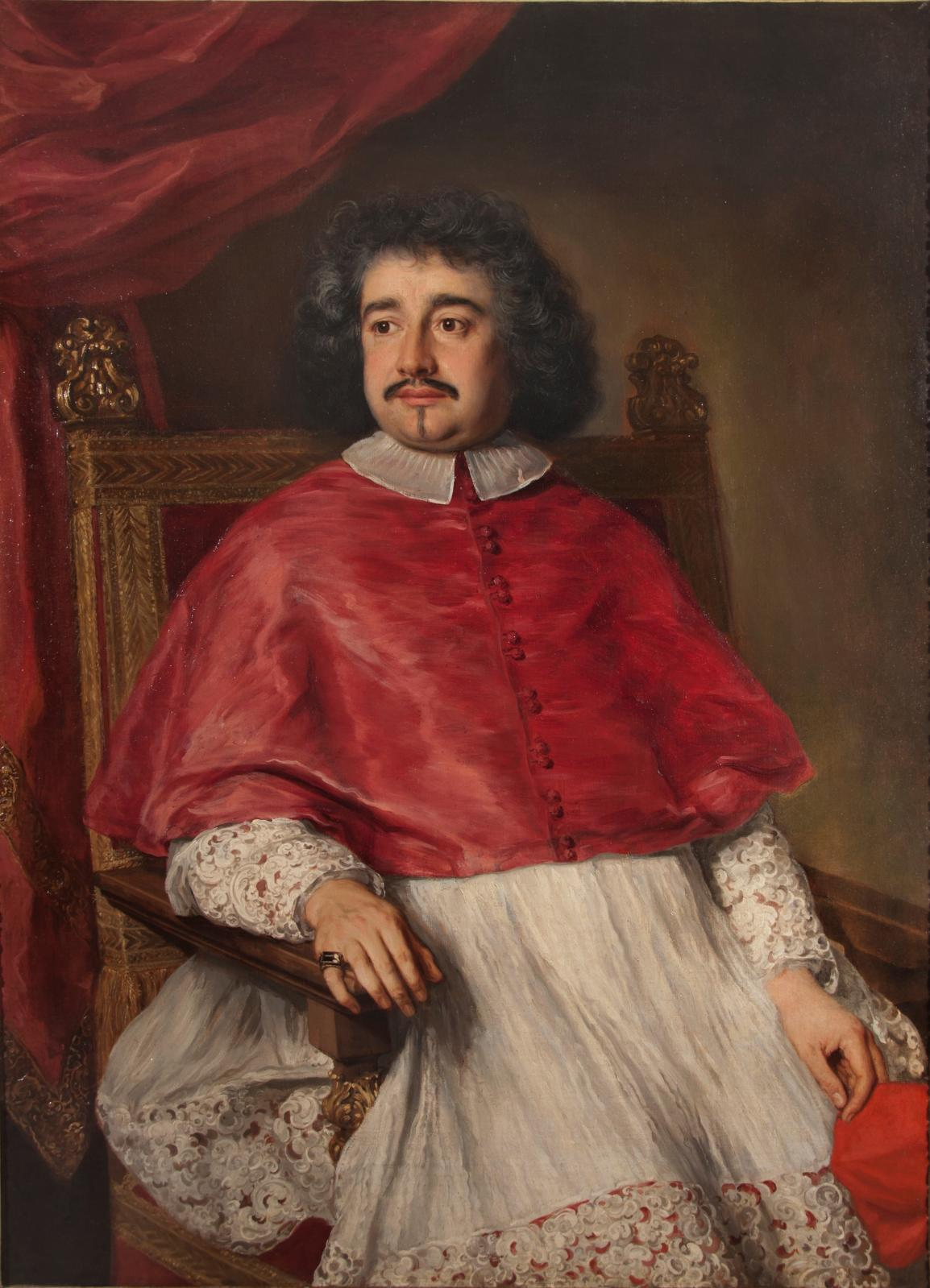
Flavio Chigi died 13 September

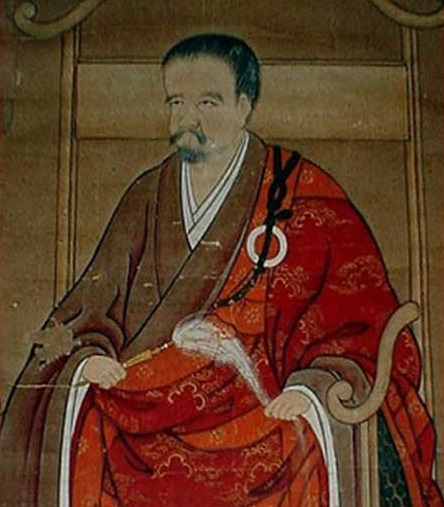
Bankei Yōtaku died 30 September

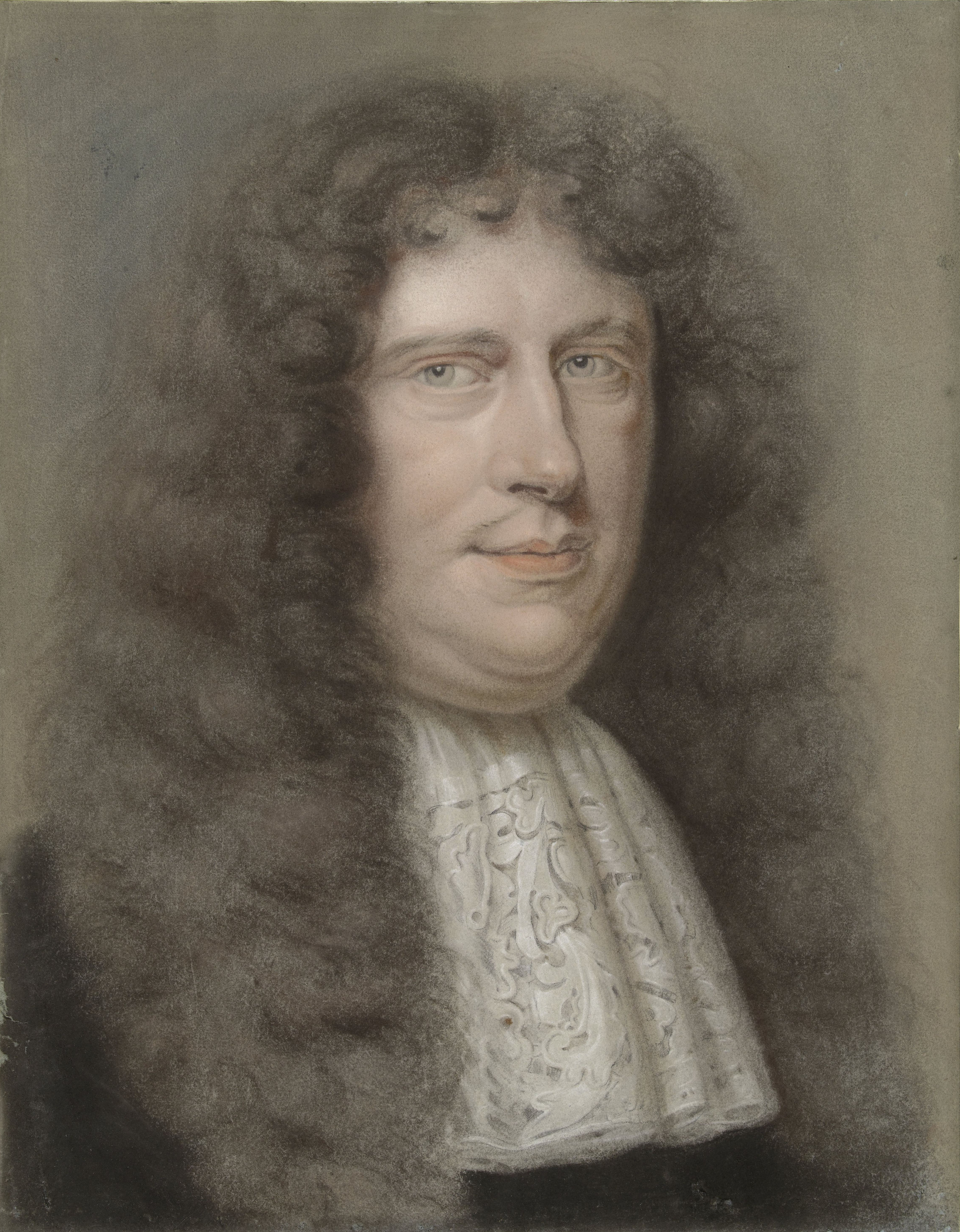
Theodor von Strattman died 25 October

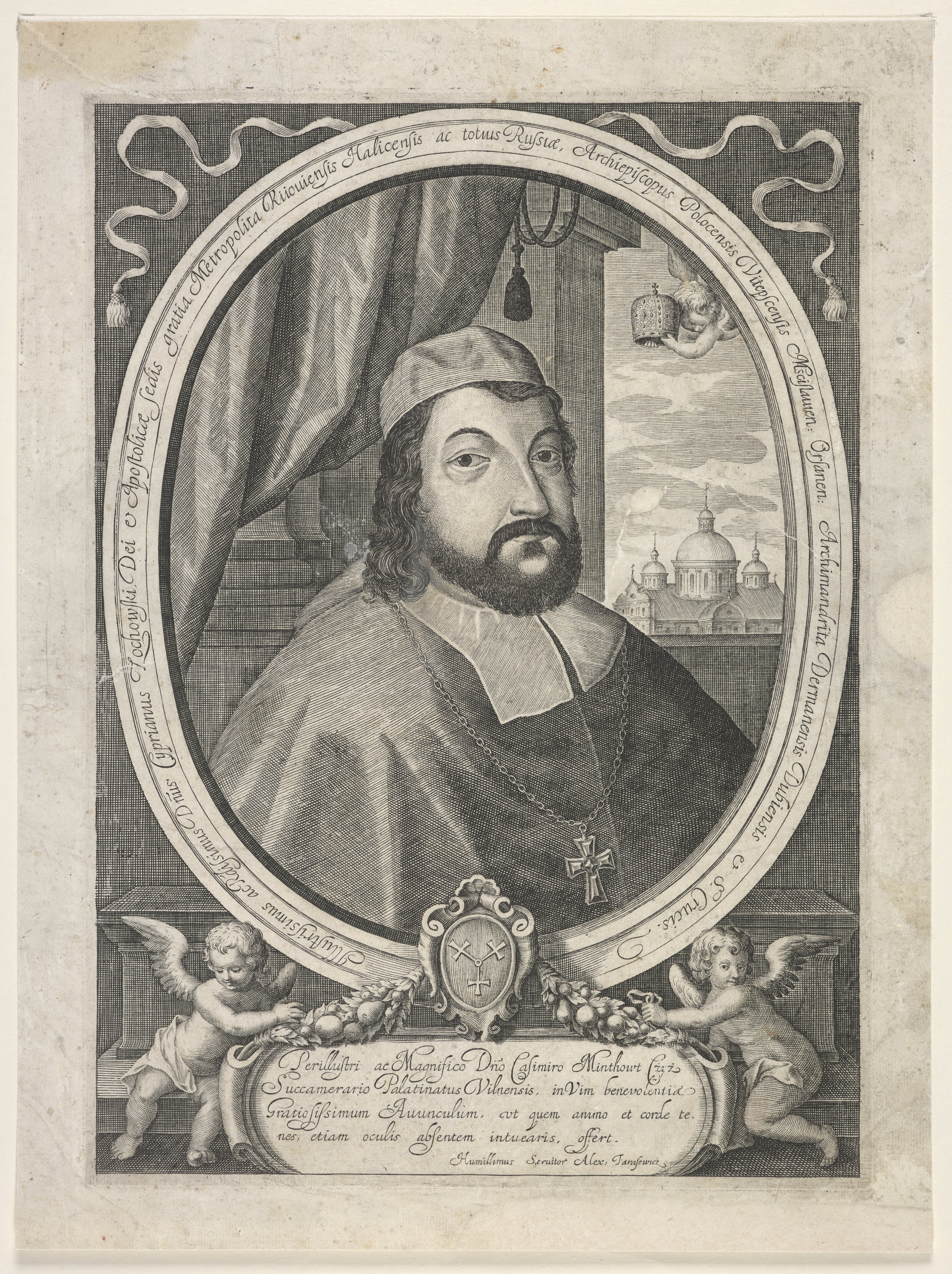
Kyprian Zochovskyj died 26 October

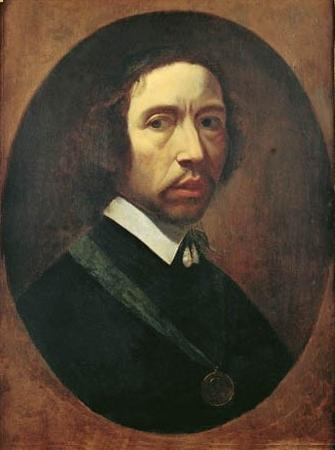
Job Adriaenszoon Berckheyde died 23 November

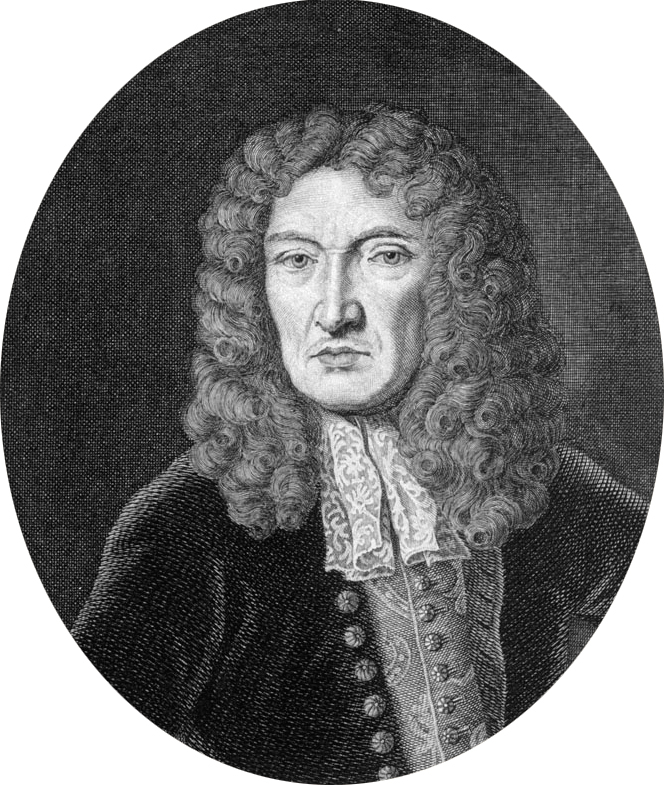
Willem van de Velde the Elder died 13 December

=== January–March ===
- January 1 – Theodor Undereyck, German theologian (b. 1635)
- January 4 – Thomas Hanford, first minister in Norwalk, Connecticut (b. 1621)
- January 6
  - Mehmed IV, Sultan of the Ottoman Empire from 1648 to 1687 (b. 1642)
  - Marguerite de la Sablière, French salonist and polymath (b. 1640)
- January 7
  - Marco Antonio Tomati, Roman Catholic bishop (b. 1583)
  - Federico Visconti, Cardinal Archbishop of Milan (b. 1617)
- January 8 – Jan Andrzej Morsztyn, Polish poet (b. 1621)
- January 21 – Honda Toshinaga, daimyo (b. 1635)
- January 27 – Anthony Lowther, English politician (b. 1641)
- January 31
  - Ahasuerus Fromanteel, English clockmaker (b. 1607)
  - Baptist Levinz, English bishop (b. 1644)
- February 4 – John de Britto, Portuguese Jesuit missionary and martyr (b. 1647)
- February 7 – Paul Pellisson, French writer (b. 1624)
- February 9 – William Turner, English Sheriff, Lord Mayor and M.P. of London (b. 1615)
- February 11 – John de Brito, Portuguese Jesuit missionary and martyr (b. 1647)
- February 13 – Johann Caspar Kerll, German composer and organist (b. 1627)
- February 18 – Elias Tillandz, Swedish physician, botanist, professor of medicine and university rector (Royal Academy of Turku) (b. 1640)
- February 21 – Pierre-Joseph-Marie Chaumonot, French missionary (b. 1611)
- February 22 – Henrik Horn, Swedish military leader and noble (b. 1618)
- February 24 – Filippo Alferio Ossorio, Catholic Bishop of Fondi (b. 1634)
- March 3 – William Stockdale, Member of Parliament (b. 1634)
- March 6 – Antonio Caraffa, Austrian Military commander (b. 1646)
- March 8 – Countess Palatine Leopoldine Eleonora of Neuburg (b. 1679)
- March 10 – Carlo Cesare Malvasia, Italian art historian (b. 1616)
- March 13 – John Rashleigh, English politician (b. 1619)
- March 17 – Richard Whithed, English politician (b. 1660)
- March 21 – Walter Chetwynd, English antiquary, politician (b. 1633)
- March 24 – Constantin Cantemir, Ruler of Moldavia (b. 1612)
- March 27 – Sylvanus Morgan, English painter (b. 1620)
- March 31 – Adriaantje Hollaer, Dutch painter (b. 1610)

=== April–June ===
- April 4
  - Isaac Aboab da Fonseca, Portuguese Sephardic rabbi (b. 1605)
  - Anne Palles, Danish witch (b. 1619)
- April 5
  - Philip William August, Count Palatine of Neuburg, Eighth son of Elector Palatine Philip William (b. 1668)
  - Anne Marie Louise d'Orléans, Duchess of Montpensier, French writer (b. 1627)
  - George Louis I, Count of Erbach-Erbach (b. 1643)
  - Christian Scriver, German hymnwriter (b. 1629)
- April 9 – Roger de Rabutin, comte de Bussy, French writer (b. 1618)
- April 15
  - Pierre Cureau de La Chambre, French priest (b. 1640)
  - Sir John Cutler, 1st Baronet, English merchant and financier (b. 1608)
- April 17 – Rutger von Ascheberg, Courland-born soldier in Swedish service (b. 1621)
- April 20 – Claudio Coello, Spanish Baroque painter (b. 1642)
- May 2 – Ernest, Landgrave of Hesse-Rheinfels and later of Hessen-Rheinfels-Rotenburg (b. 1623)
- May 3 – Claude de Rouvroy, duc de Saint-Simon, French courtier (b. 1607)
- May 6
  - François Tallemant the Elder, French translator (b. 1620)
  - William Yardley, Quaker minister (b. 1632)
- May 8 – Jan Verkolje, painter from the Northern Netherlands (b. 1650)
- May 13 – Thomas Jervoise, English politician (b. 1616)
- May 15
  - Jacques Du Frische, theologian (b. 1640)
  - John Hamilton, 2nd Lord Bargany, Scottish peer accused of treason and cleared of charges (b. 1640)
- May 16 – Philippe Couplet, Flemish Jesuit missionary (b. 1623)
- May 18 – Giacomo Altoviti, Italian religious (b. 1604)
- May 21 – Henry Erskine, 3rd Lord Cardross, Scottish nobleman and covenanter (b. 1650)
- May 25
  - Al-Hurr al-Amili, Muslim cleric and scholar (b. 1624)
  - Madame de La Fayette, French writer (b. 1634)
- May 27
  - Asano Mitsuakira (b. 1617)
  - John Spencer, English clergyman, scholar, Master of Corpus Christi College, Cambridge (b. 1630)
- June 3 – Camille de Neufville de Villeroy, Archbishop of Lyon (b. 1606)
- June 4 – John Wildman, English soldier and politician (b. 1621)
- June 6 – Dirck Ferreris, Dutch painter (b. 1634)
- June 7 – Miklós Erdődy, Ban of Croatia (b. 1630)
- June 12
  - John Ashby, Royal Navy admiral (b. 1646)
  - Christen Jensen Lodberg, Danish bishop (b. 1625)
- June 17 – Francisco Marcos de Velasco, Spanish military governor, commander of Antwerp Citadel (b. 1633)
- June 18 – Johann Heinrich von Anethan, German vicar general and canon (b. 1628)
- June 20 – Juliana of Hesse-Eschwege, German noblewoman (b. 1652)
- June 22 – Wolfgang Leinberer, German astronomer, philosopher, mathematician, professor, priest in the Society of Jesus (b. 1635)
- June 23 – Sir John Wittewrong, 1st Baronet, English parliamentarian (b. 1618)
- June 24
  - Sir Henry Lyttelton, 2nd Baronet, English politician (b. 1624)
  - Pavel Josef Vejvanovský, Czech composer (b. 1633)
  - Isaac Willaerts, painter from the Northern Netherlands (b. c. 1620)
- June 26 – John Philip II, Wild- and Rhinegrave of Salm-Dhaun (b. 1645)
- June 30 – Christina zu Mecklenburg, princess of Mecklenburg-Schwerin (b. 1639)

=== July–September ===
- July 4 – Ermanno Stroiffi, Italian painter (b. 1616)
- July 8 – François Duchesne, French historian (b. 1616)
- July 12
  - John Ashby, English admiral (b. c. 1640)
  - Johan Hadorph, Swedish director-general of the Central Board of National Antiquities (b. 1630)
- July 13
  - Cataldo Amodei, Sicilian composer (b. 1649)
  - Michiel Nouts, Dutch painter (b. 1628)
  - Johann Konrad von Roggenbach, Prince-Bishop of Basle (b. 1618)
- July 19 – Hendrik Trajectinus, Count of Solms, Dutch lieutenant-general (b. 1638)
- July 22 – John Davies, Welsh translator and writer (b. 1625)
- July 26 – Ulrika Eleonora of Denmark, Queen consort of Sweden (b. 1656)
- July 31 – Willem Kalf, painter from the Northern Netherlands (b. 1619)
- August 7 – John George II, Prince of Anhalt-Dessau (b. 1627)
- August 12 – Mark Sension, Connecticut settler (b. 1630)
- August 15 – Gregorio María de Silva y Mendoza, 9th Duke of the Infantado (b. 1649)
- August 21 – Patrick Sarsfield, 1st Earl of Lucan, Irish Jacobite peer (b. 1655)
- August 23 – Johann Daniel Major, German professor of theoretical medicine (b. 1634)
- August 27 – Edward Rawson, American settler (b. 1615)
- August 28
  - Johann Christoph Bach, German composer (b. 1645)
  - Jane Howard, Duchess of Norfolk, British noble (b. 1640)
- August 30 – Laurent Cassegrain, French priest, astronomer and physicist (b. 1629)
- September 1 – Nicolas Potier de Novion, French politician (b. 1618)
- September 5 – Otto Grote zu Schauen, German politician (b. 1636)
- September 6 – Odoardo Farnese, Hereditary Prince of Parma (b. 1666)
- September 9 – Ihara Saikaku, Japanese writer (b. 1642)
- September 12
  - Elisabeth Baulacre, Genevan industrialist (b. 1613)
  - Lionel Copley, Colonial governor of Maryland (b. 1648)
  - Gabrielle de Rochechouart de Mortemart, French noble (b. 1633)
- September 13
  - Lazar Baranovych, Ukrainian bishop (b. 1616)
  - Flavio Chigi, Italian cardinal and librarian (b. 1631)
- September 14 – Aert Jansse van Nes, Dutch admiral (b. 1626)
- September 16 – Giovanni Battista de Belli, Roman Catholic prelate, Bishop of Telese o Cerreto Sannita (b. 1630)
- September 19 – Johann Weikhard von Valvasor, Slovenian nobleman and polymath (b. 1641)
- September 24 – Henri Justel, French scholar, royal administrator, bibliophile and librarian (b. 1620)
- September 25 – William Bassett, English landowner and politician (b. 1628)
- September 27 – John Lovelace, 3rd Baron Lovelace, English politician (b. 1640)
- September 28
  - Pietro Antonio d'Alessandro, Roman Catholic bishop (b. 1628)
  - Thomas Knyvett, 7th Baron Berners, English politician (b. 1656)
- September 30 – Bankei Yōtaku, Japanese Zen buddhist monk (b. 1622)

=== October–December ===
- October 1 – Pedro Abarca, Spanish theologian (b. 1619)
- October 4 – Thomas Clayton, English politician (b. 1612)
- October 5 – George Lawton, American settler (b. 1607)
- October 8 – Thomas Bampfield, English politician (b. 1623)
- October 9
  - Marquard Sebastian Schenk von Stauffenberg, Prince-Bishop of Bamberg (b. 1644)
  - Unshō, Japanese Buddhist scriptural commentator (b. 1604)
- October 10 – Charles Patin, French physician (b. 1633)
- October 12 – Sir Christopher Conyers, 2nd Baronet, Conyers baronets and Lord Lieutenant of Durham (b. 1621)
- October 14 – Philipp Kilian, German engraver (b. 1628)
- October 17 – Charles Schomberg, 2nd Duke of Schomberg, English general (b. 1645)
- October 25 – Theodor von Strattman, Austrian diplomat (b. 1637)
- October 26
  - Coenraad van Beuningen, Dutch diplomat (b. 1622)
  - Kyprian Zochovskyj, Metropolitan of Kyiv (b. 1635)
- November 2 – Theodor Kerckring, Dutch anatomist (b. 1638)
- November 9 – Samuel Hale, Connecticut settler and politician (b. 1615)
- November 12 – Maria van Oosterwijck, Dutch Golden Age painter (b. 1623)
- November 13 – Francesco Fortezza, Roman Catholic bishop (b. 1621)
- November 16 – Francis Marsh, Irish bishop (b. 1626)
- November 23 – Job Adriaenszoon Berckheyde, Dutch painter (b. 1630)
- November 24 – William Sancroft, Archbishop of Canterbury (b. 1617)
- November 30 – Francesco Lorenzo Brancati di Lauria, Italian Catholic cardinal (b. 1612)
- December 5 – Levinus Bennet, English politician (b. 1631)
- December 12 – Countess Palatine Anna Magdalena of Birkenfeld-Bischweiler, Countess of Hanau-Lichtenberg (b. 1640)
- December 13
  - Dosoftei, Moldavian Metropolitan (b. 1624)
  - Willem van de Velde the Elder, Dutch painter (b. c. 1611)
- December 14 – Giuseppe Felice Tosi, Italian composer (b. 1619)
- December 16 – Jacques Rousseau, painter from France (b. 1630)
- December 21 – Hendrick Mommers, Dutch painter (b. 1623)
- December 22 – Elisabeth Hevelius, Danzig astronomer (b. 1647)
- December 24 – Nicolaes Maes, Dutch painter (b. 1634)
- December 27 – Henri de Villars, French prelate (b. 1621)
- December 29 – Vere Fane, 4th Earl of Westmorland, English Earl (b. 1644)
- date unknown – Lars Nilsson, Sami shaman in Sweden

1694

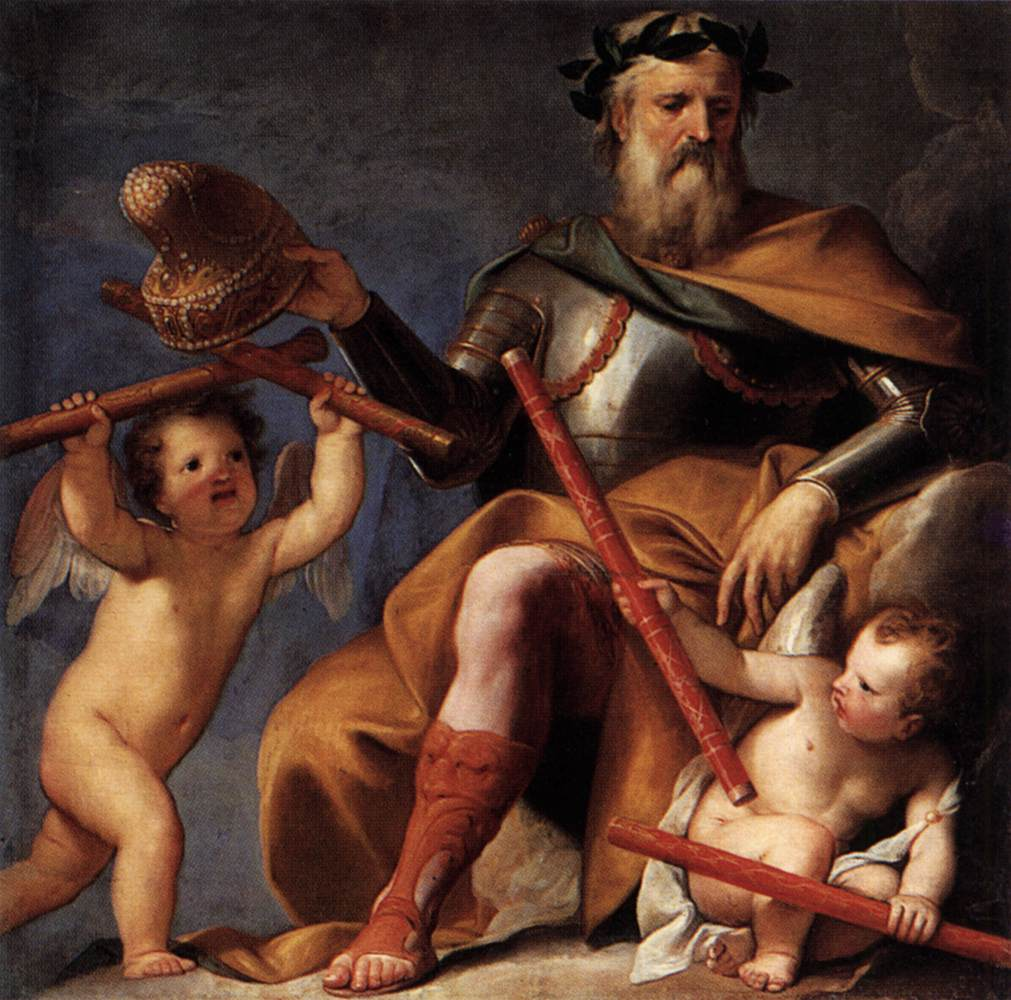
Francesco Morosini died 16 January

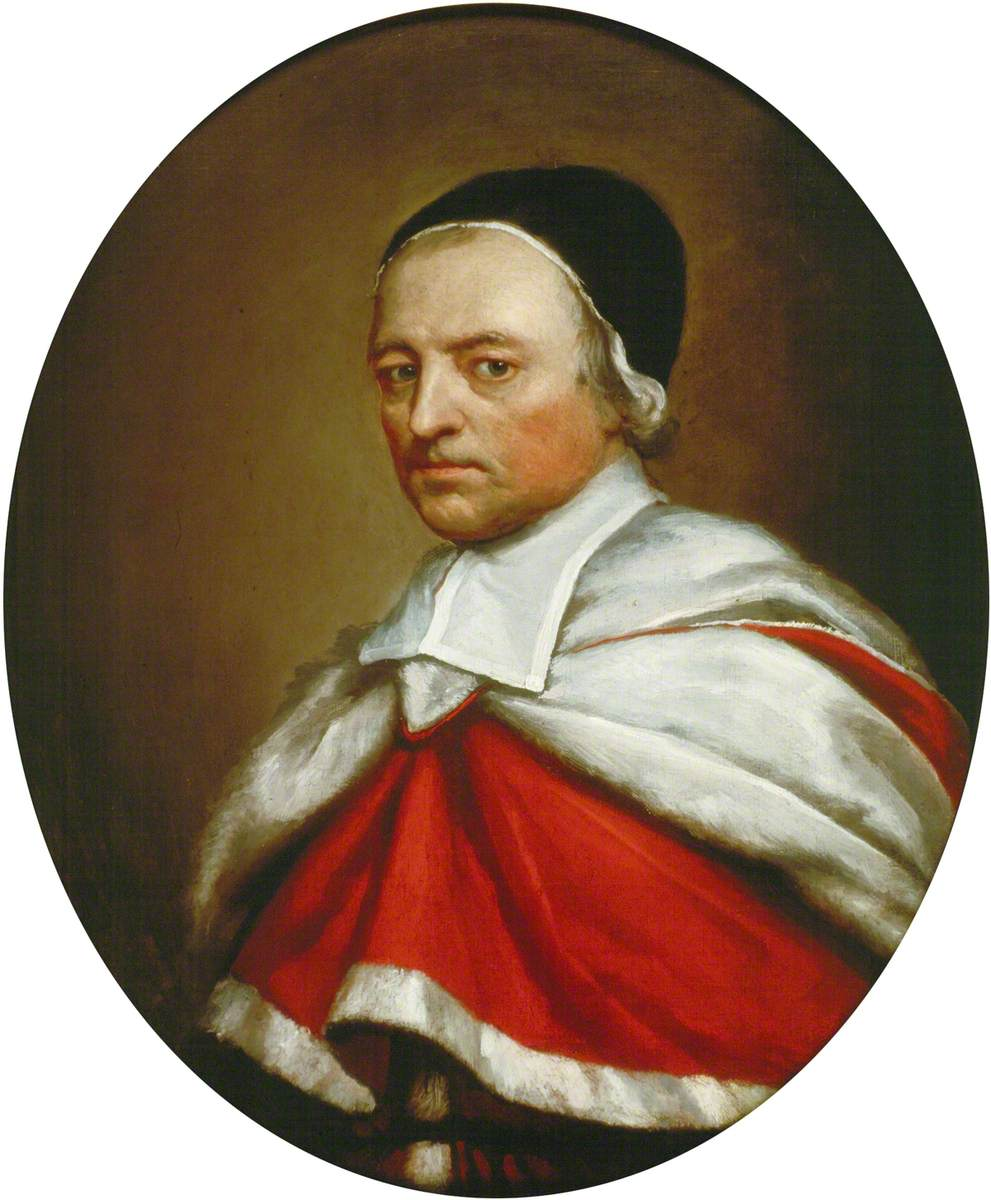
William Dolben (judge) died 25 January

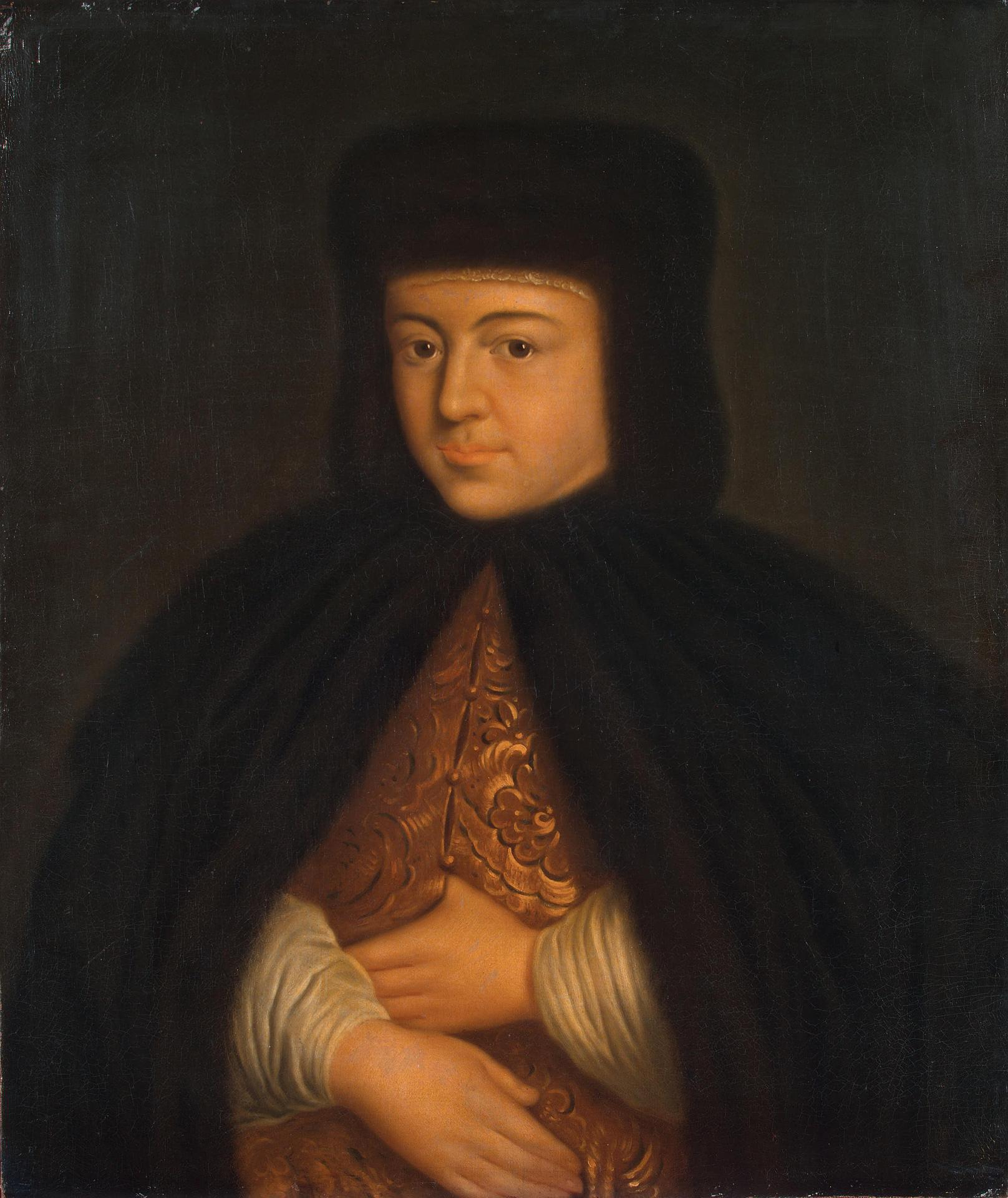
Natalya Naryshkina died 4 February

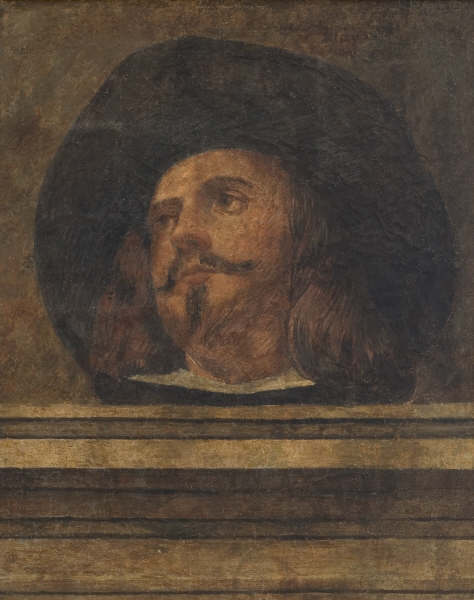
Nicolás de Villacis died 8 April

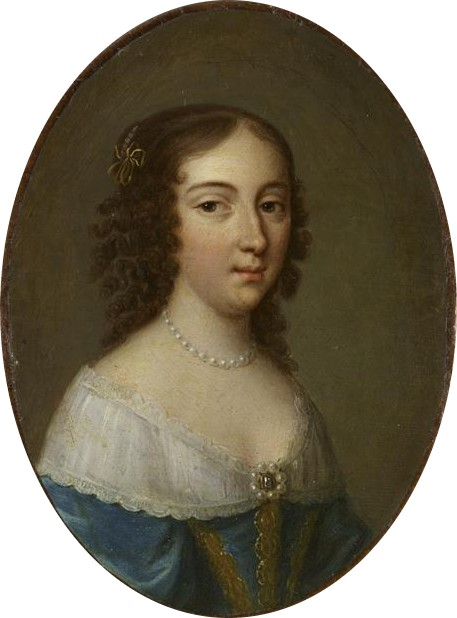
Claire-Clémence de Maillé-Brézé died 16 April

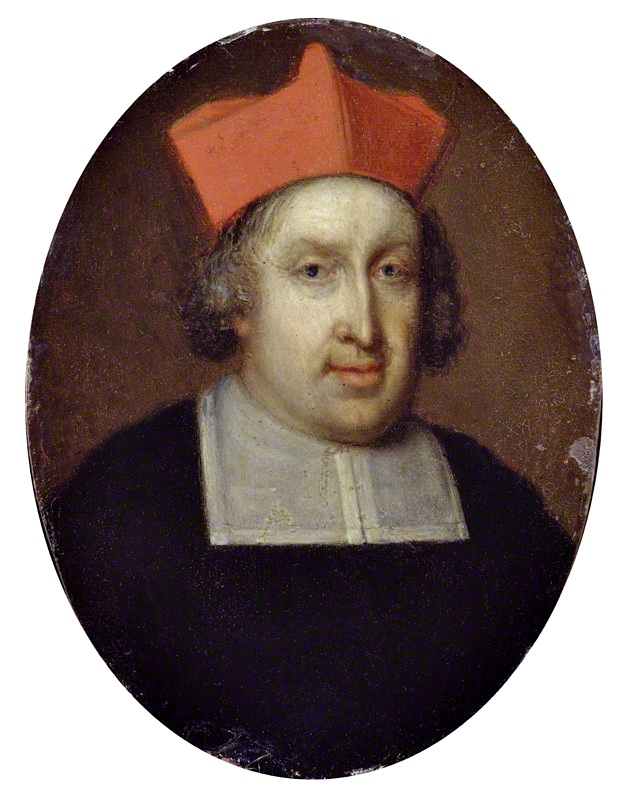
Philip Howard (cardinal) died 17 June

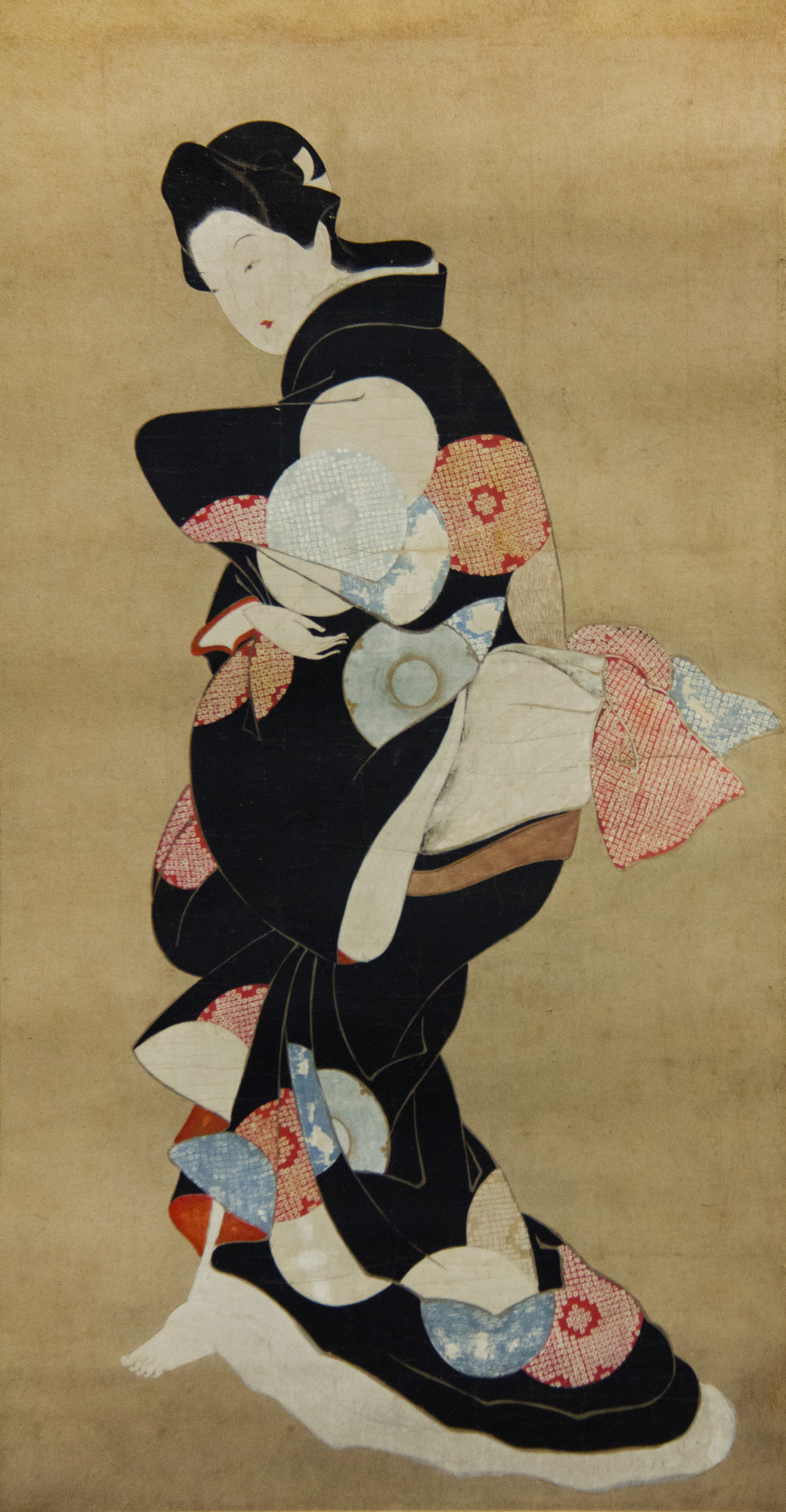
Hishikawa Moronobu died 25 July

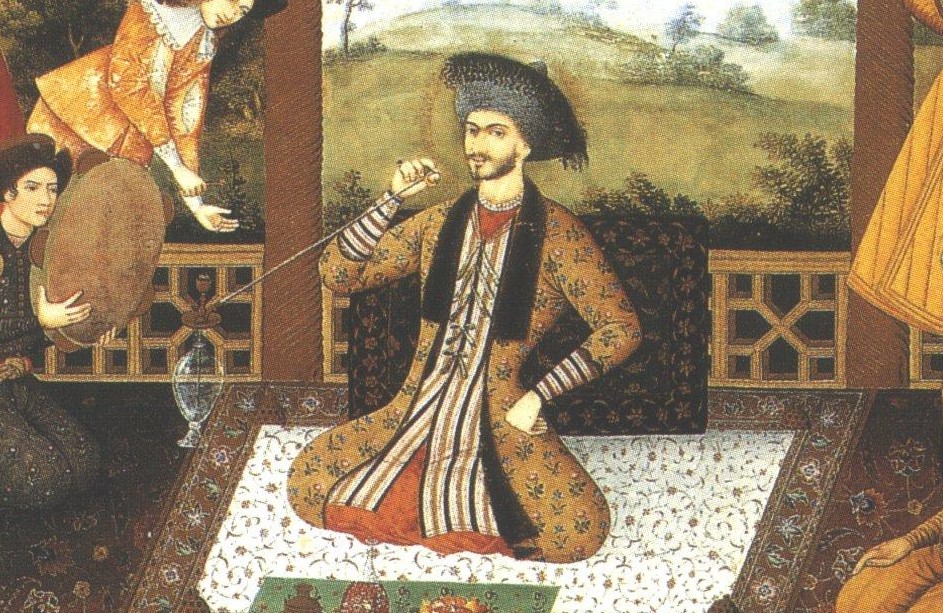
Suleiman I of Persia died 29 July

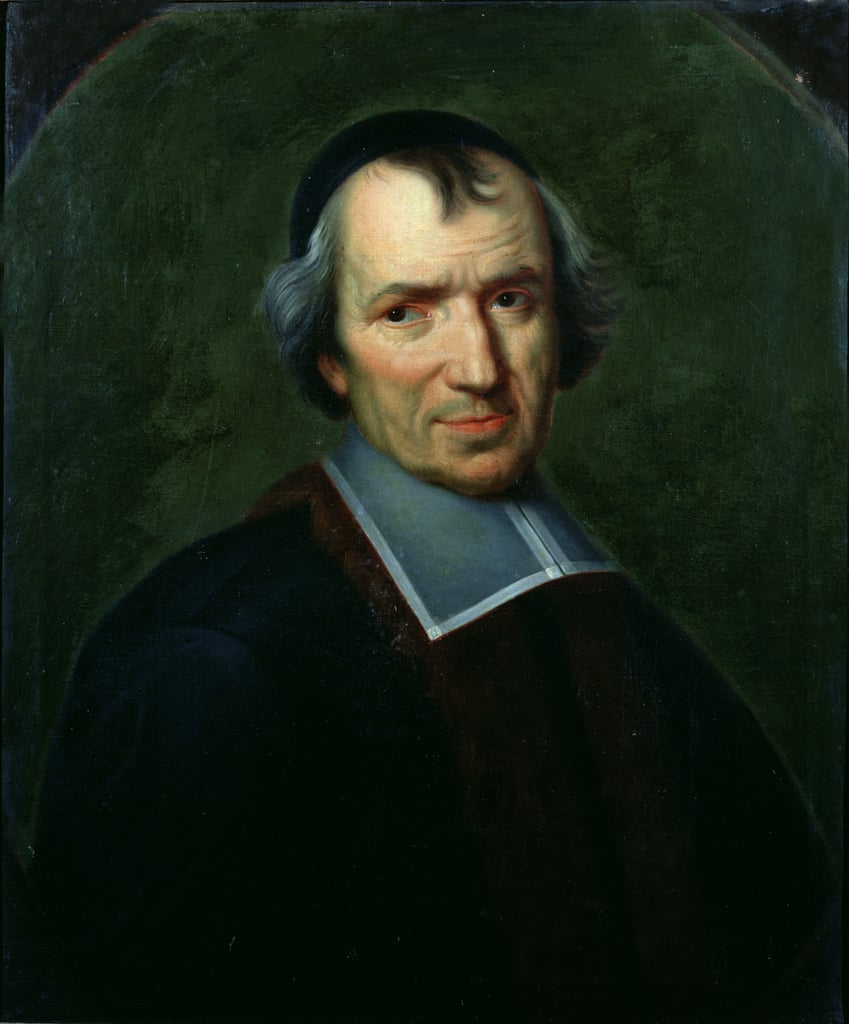
Antoine Arnauld died 8 August

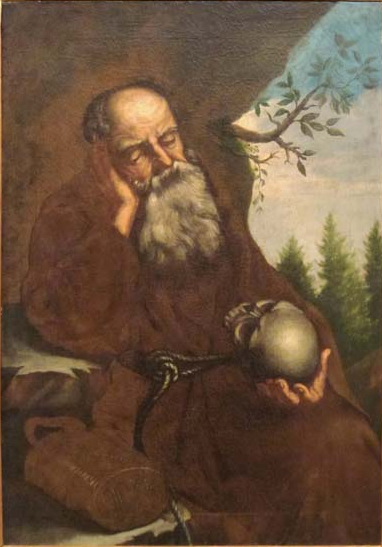
Bernard of Offida died 22 August

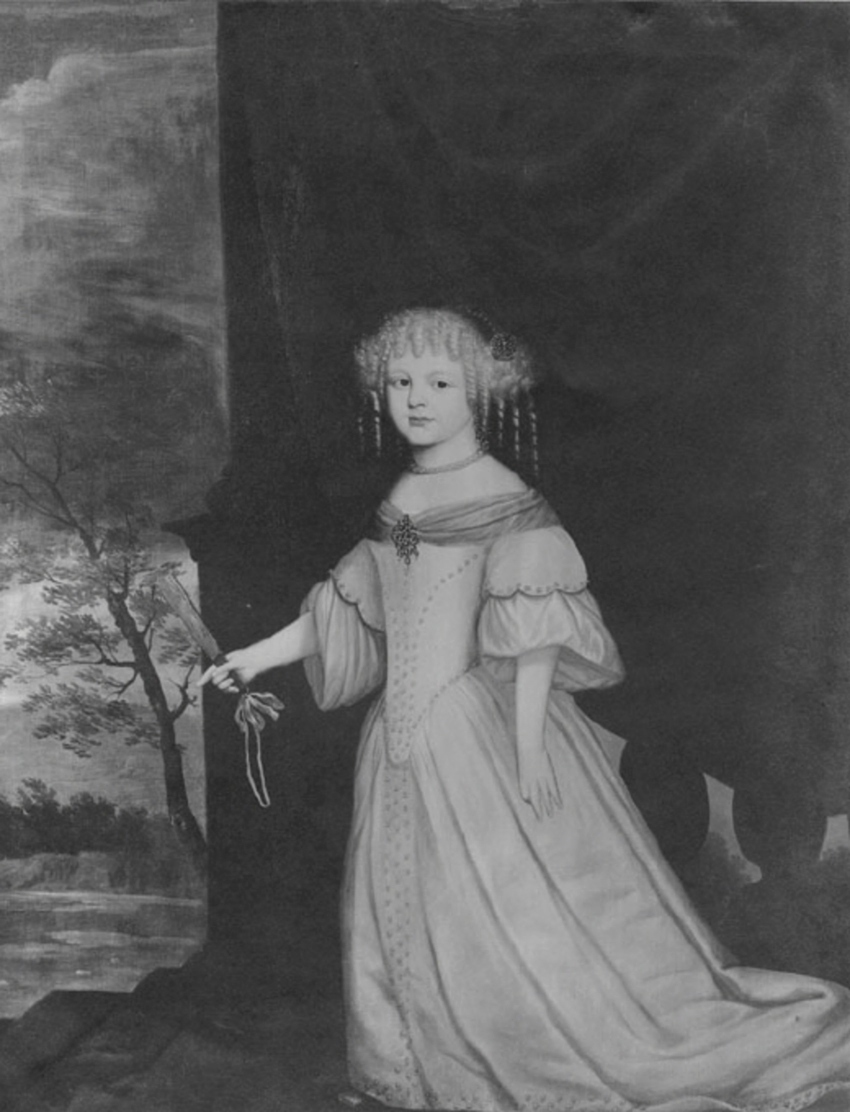
Princess Sophie Auguste of Anhalt-Zerbst died 14 September

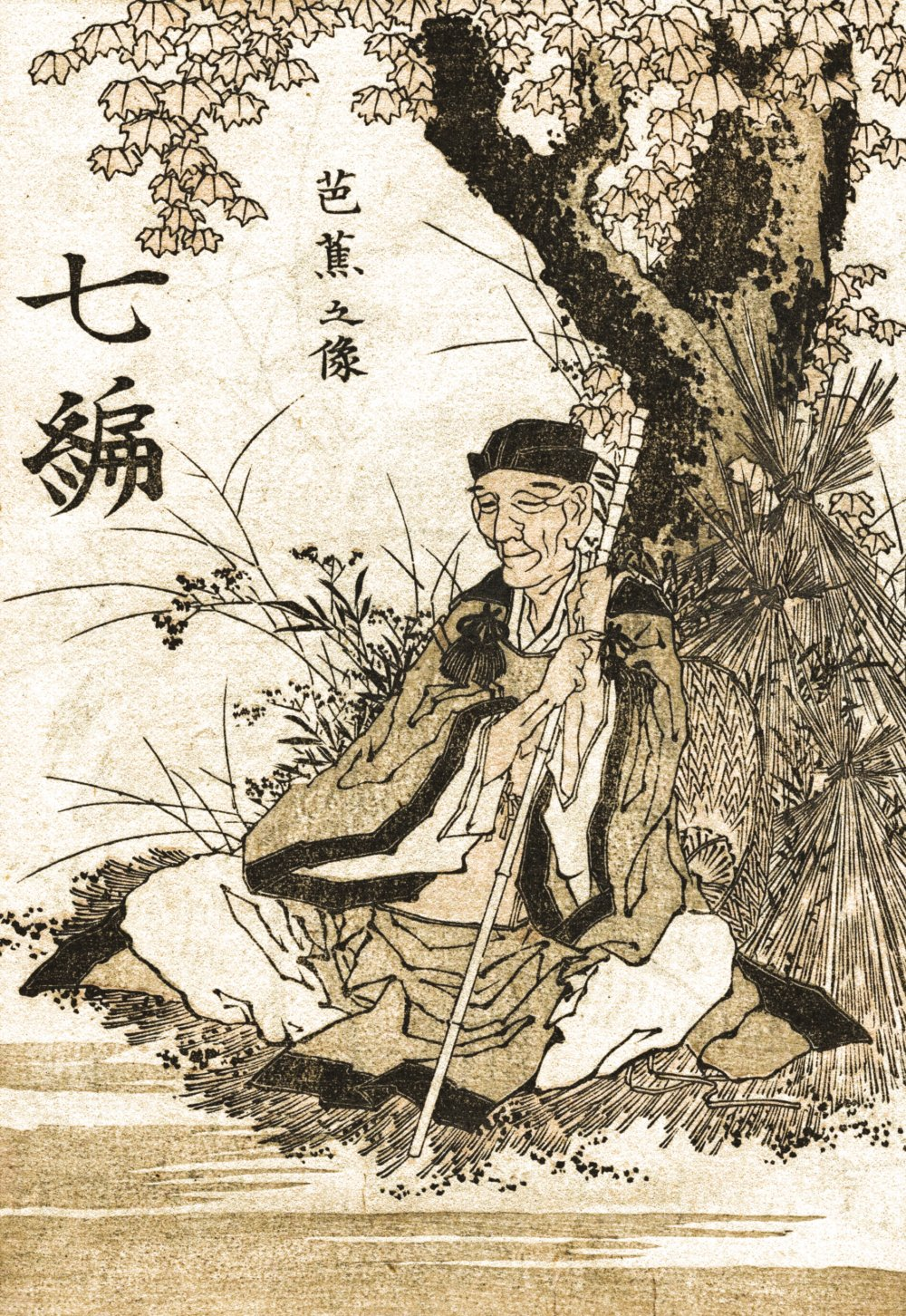
Matsuo Bashō died 28 November

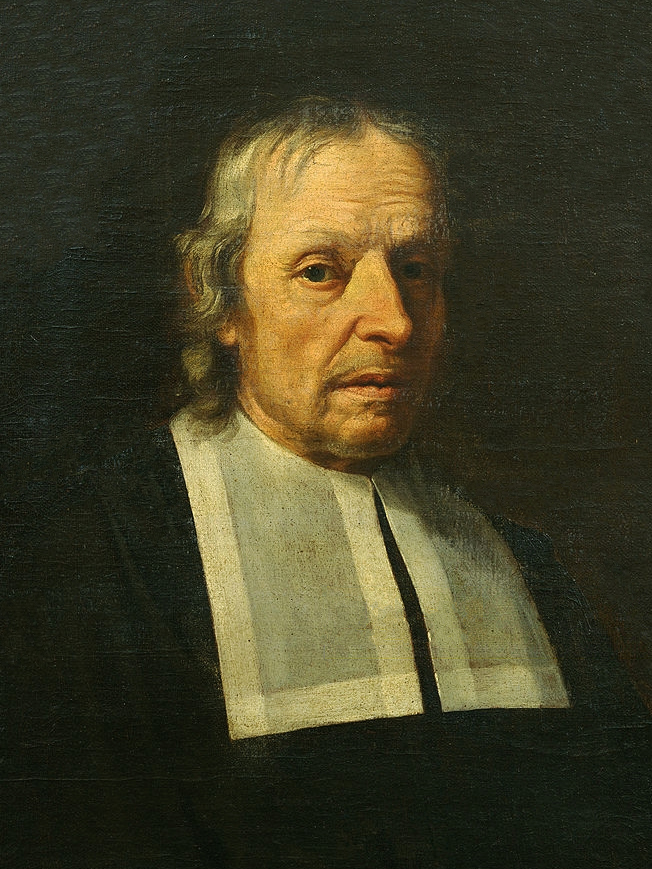
Marcello Malpighi died 29 November

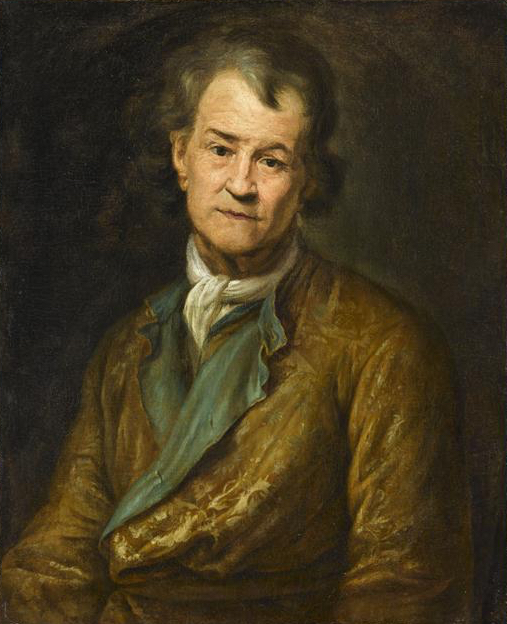
Pierre Puget died 2 December

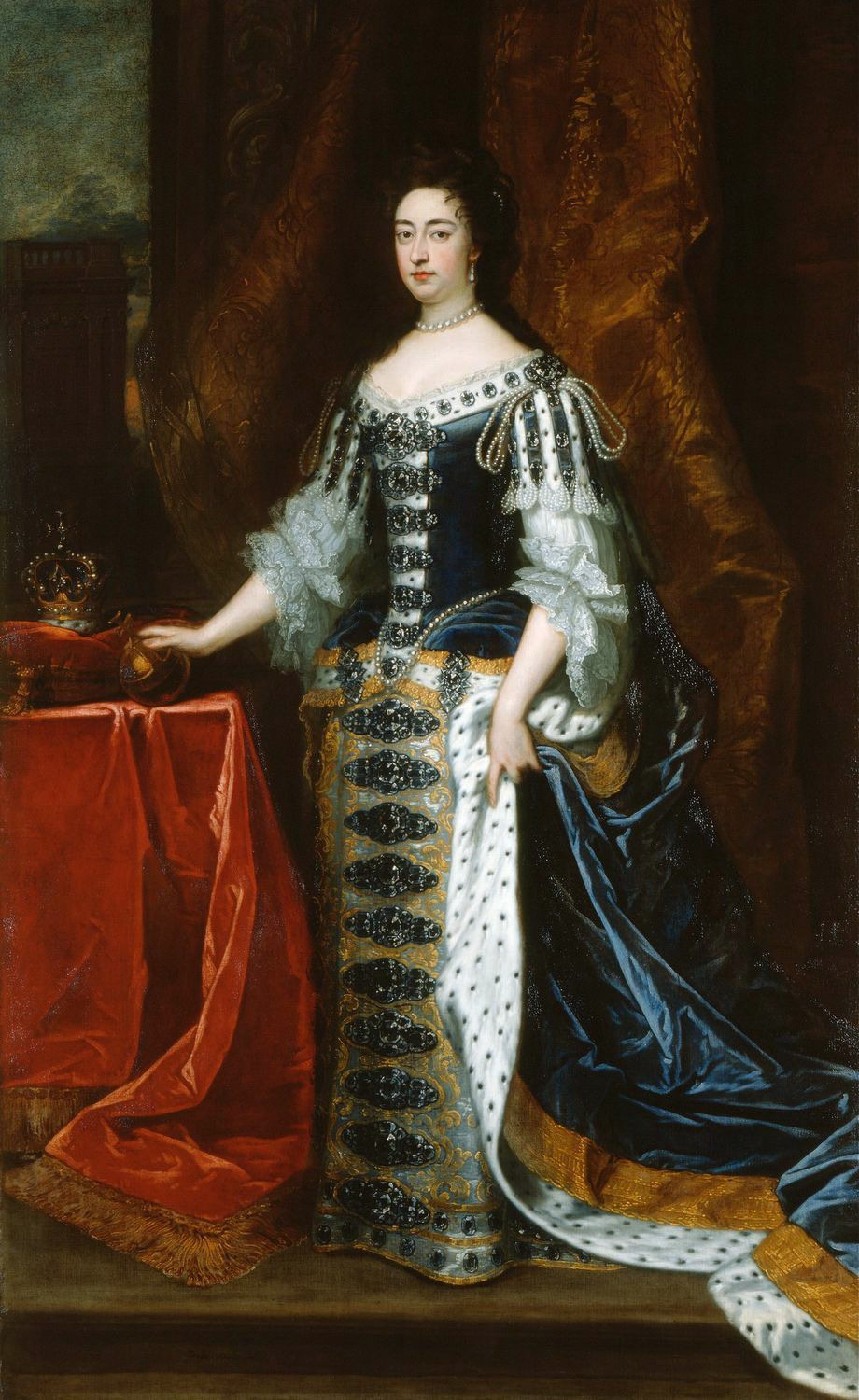
Mary II of England died 28 December

=== January–March ===
- January 2 – Henry Booth, 1st Earl of Warrington, English politician and Earl (b. 1652)
- January 7 – Charles Gerard, 1st Earl of Macclesfield, English aristocrat and soldier (b. c. 1618)
- January 8 – Thomas Strickland, English royalist soldier (b. 1621)
- January 10 – Andrew Balfour, British doctor and botanist (b. 1630)
- January 16
  - John Lamotte Honywood, English Member of Parliament (b. 1647)
  - Francesco Morosini, Doge of Venice from 1688 to 1694 (b. 1619)
- January 17
  - Anselm de Guibours, Augustinian friar and genealogist (b. 1625)
  - Francis Sandford, English herald (b. 1630)
- January 19 – François Marie, Prince of Lillebonne, French nobleman and member of the House of Lorraine (b. 1624)
- January 25 – William Dolben, English judge (b. 1627)
- January 31 – Henry Northleigh, English Member of Parliament (b. 1643)
- February 1 – John Louis of Elderen, Bishop of Liege (b. 1620)
- February 4
  - Leonhard Baldner, French naturalist (b. 1612)
  - Natalya Naryshkina, Tsaritsa of Russia (b. 1651)
- February 8 – Domenico Santi, Italian painter (b. 1621)
- February 9 – Anne-Marie Bigot de Cornuel, French salon-holder (b. 1605)
- February 17 – Antoinette du Ligier de la Garde Deshoulières, French writer, poet (b. 1638)
- February 19
  - Jerzy Franciszek Kulczycki, Polish noble (b. 1640)
  - Gennaro Sanfelice, Roman Catholic archbishop (b. 1622)
  - Francis Wheler, Royal Navy officer (b. 1656)
- February 21 – Simon Abeles, Jewish youth in Prague whose father was accused of murdering him “out of hatred for the Christian faith” (b. 1682)
- February 23 – Sir Thomas Samwell, 1st Baronet, English politician (b. 1650)
- February 25 – Gilles Hallet, Flemish Baroque painter (b. 1620)
- February 26 – Charles Scarborough, English physician and natural philosopher (b. 1615)
- March 5 – Vittoria della Rovere, Italian noble (b. 1622)
- March 10 – Paul Fréart de Chantelou, art collector (b. 1609)
- March 11 – Jean-Nicolas Geoffroy, French harpsichordist and composer (b. 1633)
- March 12 – John Conant, English theologian, clergyman, and academic administrator (b. 1608)
- March 15 – Cresheld Draper, English politician (b. 1646)
- March 24 – Peter Colleton, English politician (b. 1635)
- March 25 – Greenvile Collins, English hydrographer (b. 1643)
- March 26 – Arthur Stanhope, English politician (b. 1627)

=== April–June ===
- April 5 – Diego Ibáñez de la Madrid y Bustamente, Roman Catholic bishop (b. 1649)
- April 8 – Nicolás de Villacis, Spanish painter (b. 1616)
- April 9 – Angelo Berardi, Italian composer and music theorist (b. 1630)
- April 10 – Catharina Regina von Greiffenberg, Austrian writer and noble (b. 1633)
- April 12 – John Swinfen, English politician (b. 1613)
- April 13 – José de Jesús María Fajardo, Spanish Roman Catholic prelate; Bishop of Alghero (b. 1643)
- April 14 – Magdalena Sibylla of Neidschutz, German countess (b. 1675)
- April 16 – Claire-Clémence de Maillé-Brézé, French noblewoman (b. 1628)
- April 17 – François IV de Beauharnais, French nobleman (b. 1636)
- April 18 – William Hamilton, Duke of Hamilton in the Peerage of Scotland (b. 1634)
- April 20
  - Giovanni Carlo Antonelli, Roman Catholic prelate, Bishop of Ferentino (b. 1612)
  - Johann Balthasar Lauterbach, German architect and mathematician (b. 1663)
- April 27 – John George IV, Elector of Saxony, German noble (b. 1668)
- May 1 – Maria Elisabeth Lämmerhirt, Mother of Johann Sebastian Bach (b. 1644)
- May 2 – Martin Desjardins, French sculptor (b. 1637)
- May 4 – Ludwig Anton von Pfalz-Neuburg, Roman Catholic bishop (b. 1660)
- May 17 – Johann Michael Bach, German composer (b. 1648)
- May 20 – Robert Spencer, 1st Viscount Teviot, Member of the Parliament of England (b. 1629)
- May 24 – Anthony Cary, 5th Viscount Falkland, English politician (b. 1656)
- May 27 – Thomas Hervey, politician of Ickworth, Suffolk (b. 1625)
- June 2
  - Sir Thomas Skipwith, 1st Baronet, Member of the English Parliament (b. 1620)
  - Gaspar Téllez-Girón, 5th Duke de Osuna, Spanish duke (b. 1625)
- June 8 – Pieter van der Willigen, Dutch painter (b. 1634)
- June 17
  - Louis Chein, French composer (b. 1637)
  - Philip Howard, English Catholic Cardinal (b. 1629)
- June 22 – Thomas Tollemache, English general (b. 1651)
- June 27 – François Louis, Count of Harcourt, French count (b. 1627)
- June 28 – Francisco Spinola, Roman Catholic clergyman (b. 1654)
- June 30 – Pieter Claesen Wyckoff, American farmer and landowner (b. 1625)

=== July–September ===
- July 1
  - Philippe Goibaut, French translator (b. 1626)
  - Justin McCarthy, Viscount Mountcashel, General in the Williamite War in Ireland (b. 1638)
  - Peter Christoffersen Tønder, Norwegian government official (b. 1641)
- July 6 – Francesco Beretta, Italian composer (b. 1640)
- July 11 – Philip Christoph von Königsmarck, Swedish count of Brandenburgian extraction and a soldier (b. 1665)
- July 12 – Juan de Santiago y León Garabito, Spanish Catholic prelate, Bishop of Guadalajara and Bishop of Puerto Rico (b. 1641)
- July 19 – René Ouvrard, French composer (b. 1624)
- July 21 – Jacob Jensen Jersin, Danish-Norwegian theologian, priest, bishop of the Diocese of Christianssand (b. 1633)
- July 25
  - Robert Fleming the elder, Scottish Presbyterian Minister, died 1694 (b. 1630)
  - Hishikawa Moronobu, Japanese painter and printmaker (b. 1618)
- July 27 – George Pitt, English politician (b. 1625)
- July 28 – William Lowther, English Member of Parliament (b. 1668)
- July 29 – Suleiman I of Persia, Shah of Persia from 1666 to 1694 (b. 1647)
- August 1
  - Jean-Claude Rambot, 17th century French sculptor and architect in Aix-en-Provence (b. 1618)
  - John Michael Wright, portrait painter (b. 1617)
- August 5
  - Mareen Duvall, American settler (b. 1625)
  - Mogens Skeel, Danish playwright (b. 1651)
- August 6 – Gabriel de la Corte, Spanish painter (b. 1648)
- August 8 – Antoine Arnauld, French theologian, philosopher, mathematician (b. 1612)
- August 21 – Tommaso Saladini, Roman Catholic bishop (b. 1647)
- August 22
  - Samuel Aboab, rabbi (b. 1610)
  - Maria Sofia De la Gardie, Swedish countess and industrialist (b. 1627)
  - Bernard of Offida, Italian saint (b. 1604)
- August 28 – Francesco Antonio Picchiatti, Italian architect (b. 1617)
- August 29 – Sir Richard Everard, 2nd Baronet, English politician (b. 1625)
- August 30 – Louis de Crevant, Duke of Humières, Marshal of France (b. 1628)
- September 3 – Jean Barbier d'Aucour, French lawyer to the parliament of Paris, ardent Jansenist and satirist (b. 1641)
- September 6 – Francesco II d'Este, Duke of Modena, Italian noble (b. 1660)
- September 7 – Andrija Zmajević, Serbian poet (b. 1624)
- September 10 – Thomas Lloyd, Lieutenant-governor of provincial Pennsylvania and Quaker preacher (b. 1640)
- September 14
  - Princess Sophie Auguste of Anhalt-Zerbst (b. 1663)
  - Jonathan Cope, English politician; (b. 1664)
  - Thomas Savage, 3rd Earl Rivers, English Earl (b. 1628)
- September 22 – Henry Neville, English politician (b. 1620)
- September 24 – Jean Garet, French monk (b. 1627)
- September 27 – Giuseppe Colombi, musician, composer (b. 1635)
- September 28 – Gabriel Mouton, French abbot and scientist (b. 1619)
- September 29
  - Leopold Louis, Count Palatine of Veldenz, German noble (b. 1625)
  - Katarzyna Sobieska, Polish noble (b. 1634)

=== October–December ===
- October 6 – Sugiyama Waichi, Japanese acupuncturist (b. 1610)
- October 9 – Jean-Louis Bergeret, French lawyer (b. 1641)
- October 12
  - Charles Boyle, 3rd Viscount Dungarvan, British politician (b. 1639)
  - Delphin Strungk, German composer (b. 1601)
- October 13 – Johann Christoph Pezel, German violinist, trumpeter and composer (b. 1639)
- October 18 – Pierre Ango, French Catholic priest and scientist (b. 1640)
- October 19 – Pierre Menault, French composer (b. 1642)
- October 20 – Christian II, Duke of Saxe-Merseburg (b. 1653)
- October 26 – Samuel von Pufendorf, German philosopher (b. 1632)
- October 27 – Gevherhan Sultan, Daughter of Ottoman Sultan Ibrahim I (b. 1642)
- October 30
  - Francis Fenwick, English monk (b. 1645)
  - Raimondo del Pozzo, Roman Catholic prelate, Bishop of Vieste (b. 1622)
- November 7 – Jacques de Claeuw, painter from the Northern Netherlands (b. 1623)
- November 14 – Christian III Maurice, Duke of Saxe-Merseburg, German duke (b. 1680)
- November 16 – Jacques-Théodore de Bryas, clergyman from the Low Countries, bishop of Saint-Omer and archbishop of Cambrai (b. 1631)
- November 22 – John Tillotson, Archbishop of Canterbury (b. 1630)
- November 23
  - Vicente de Gonzaga y Doria, Viceroy of Valencia, 1663, Viceroy of Catalonia, 1664–1667 and Viceroy of Sicily 1679 (b. 1602)
  - Jean Talon, first Intendant of New France (b. 1626)
- November 25 – Ismaël Bullialdus, French astronomer (b. 1605)
- November 28 – Matsuo Bashō, Japanese poet (b. 1644)
- November 29 – Marcello Malpighi, Italian physician (b. 1628)
- December 2 – Pierre Puget, French painter, sculptor, architect and engineer (b. 1620)
- December 4
  - Bernardin Gigault de Bellefonds, Marshal of France (b. 1630)
  - Jean-Baptiste Boisot, French abbot, bibliophile and scholar (b. 1638)
- December 5 – William Beecher, English politician (b. 1628)
- December 7 – Tiberio Fiorilli, Italian-born actor (b. 1608)
- December 9 – Paolo Segneri, Italian Jesuit (b. 1624)
- December 11 – Ranuccio II Farnese, Duke of Parma from 1646 until his death (b. 1630)
- December 12 – Filippo Lauri, Italian painter (b. 1623)
- December 20 – Erasmus Finx, German polymath (b. 1627)
- December 24 – Giovanni Paolo Meniconi, Catholic bishop (b. 1629)
- December 26 – Francis Cuffe, politician (b. 1654)
- December 27 – Henrik Span, naval officer in the Dutch (b. 1634)
- December 28
  - Henry Arundell, 3rd Baron Arundell of Wardour, English Baron (b. 1607)
  - Mary II, Queen of England, Scotland, and Ireland (b. 1662)
- date unknown – Hafız Post, Turkish musician (b. c. 1630)

1695

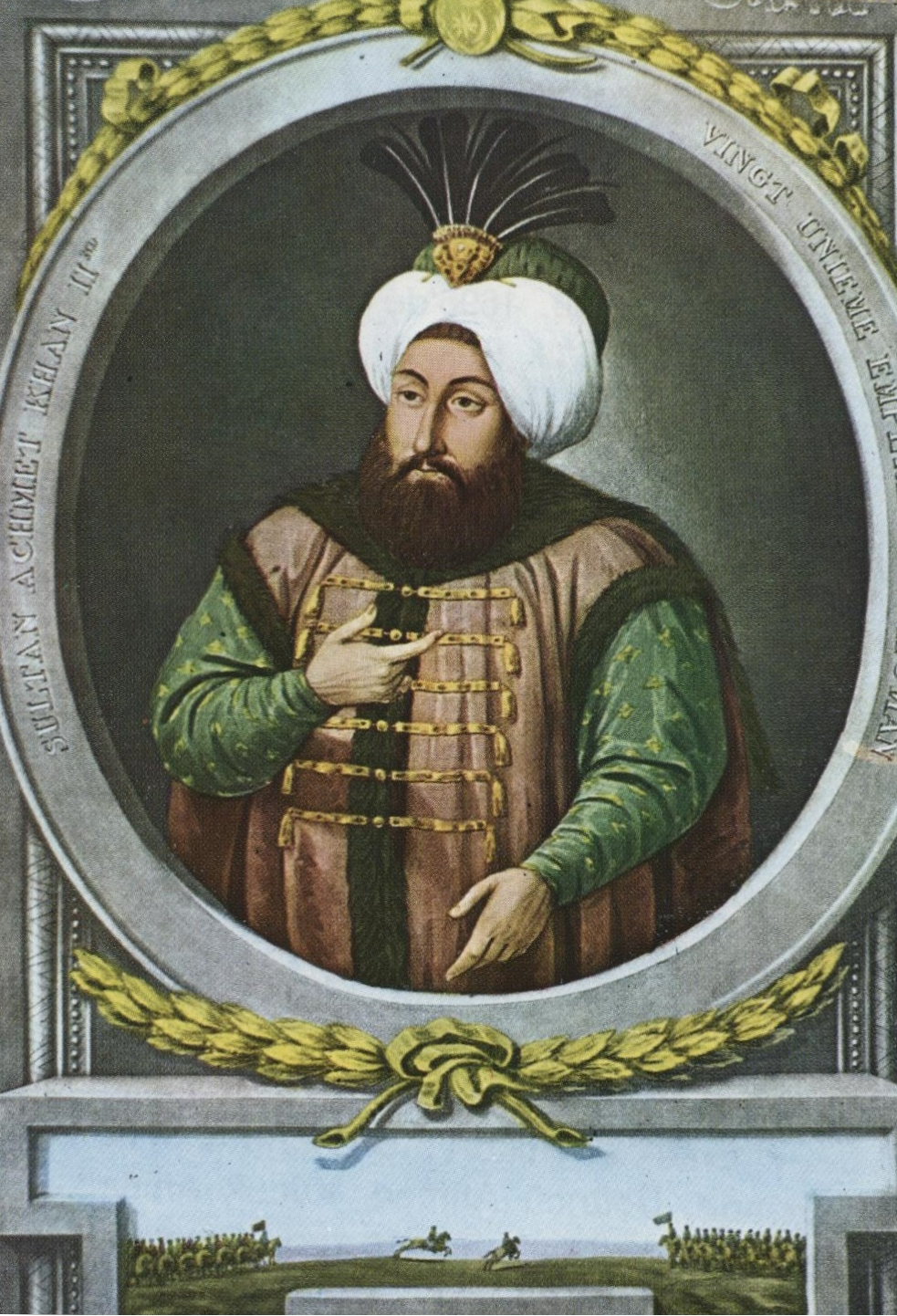
Ahmed II died 6 February

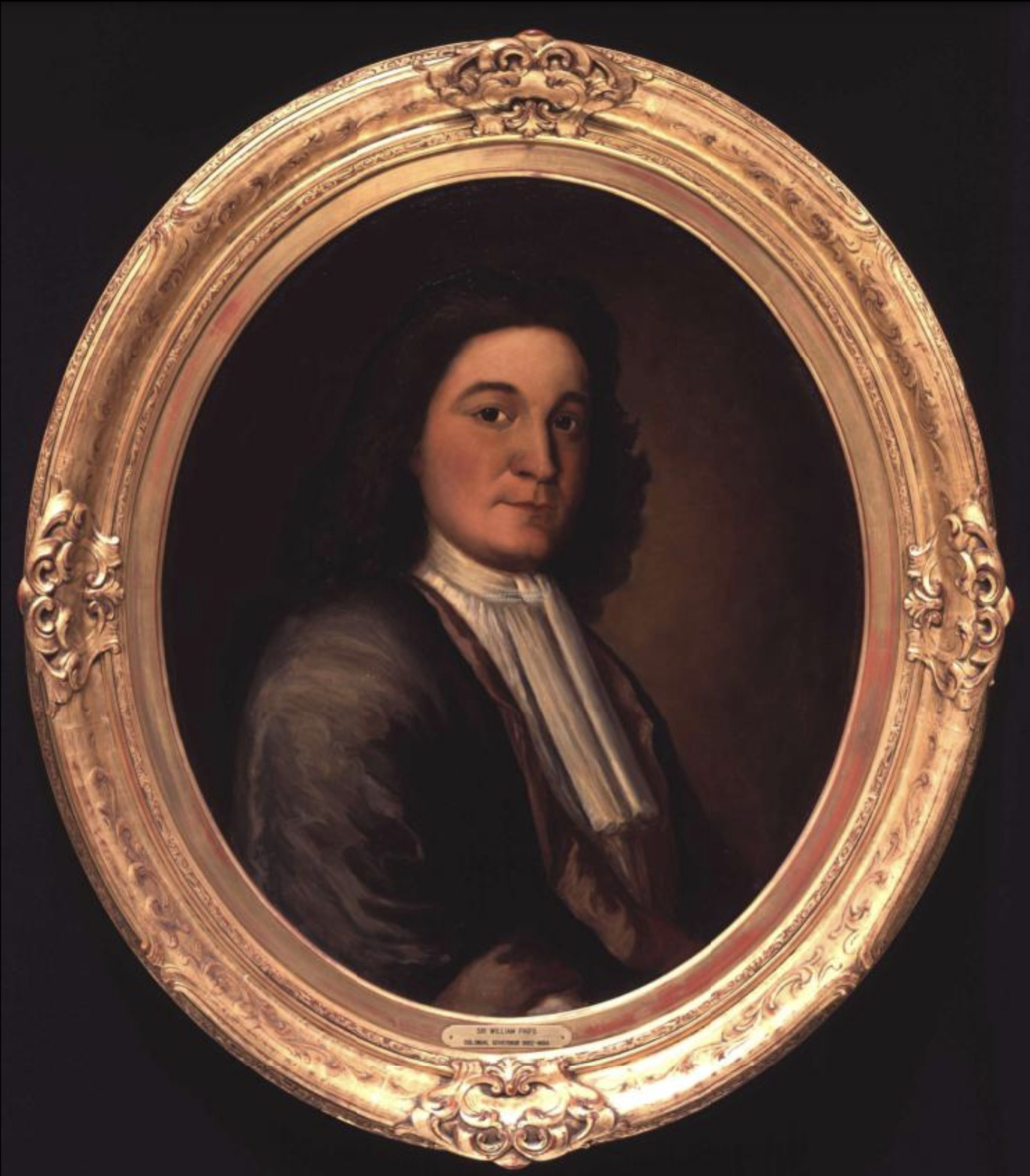
William Phips died 18 February

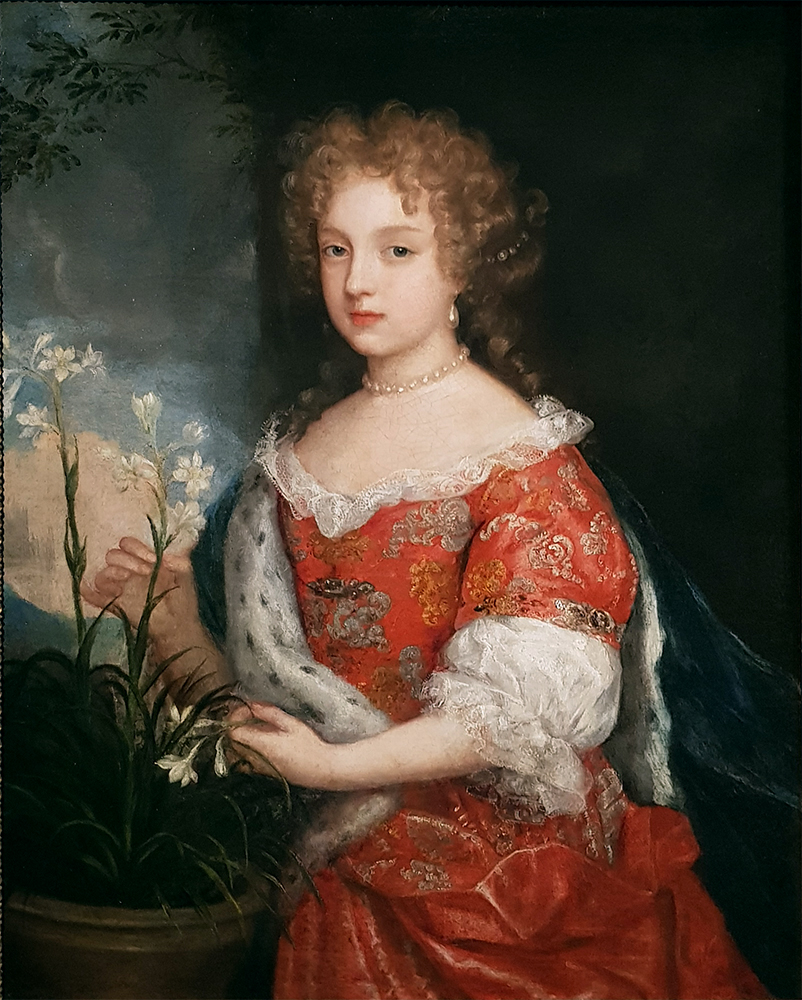
Ludwika Karolina Radziwiłł died 25 March

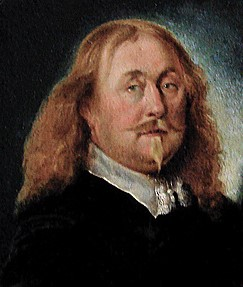
Lambert van Haven died 9 May

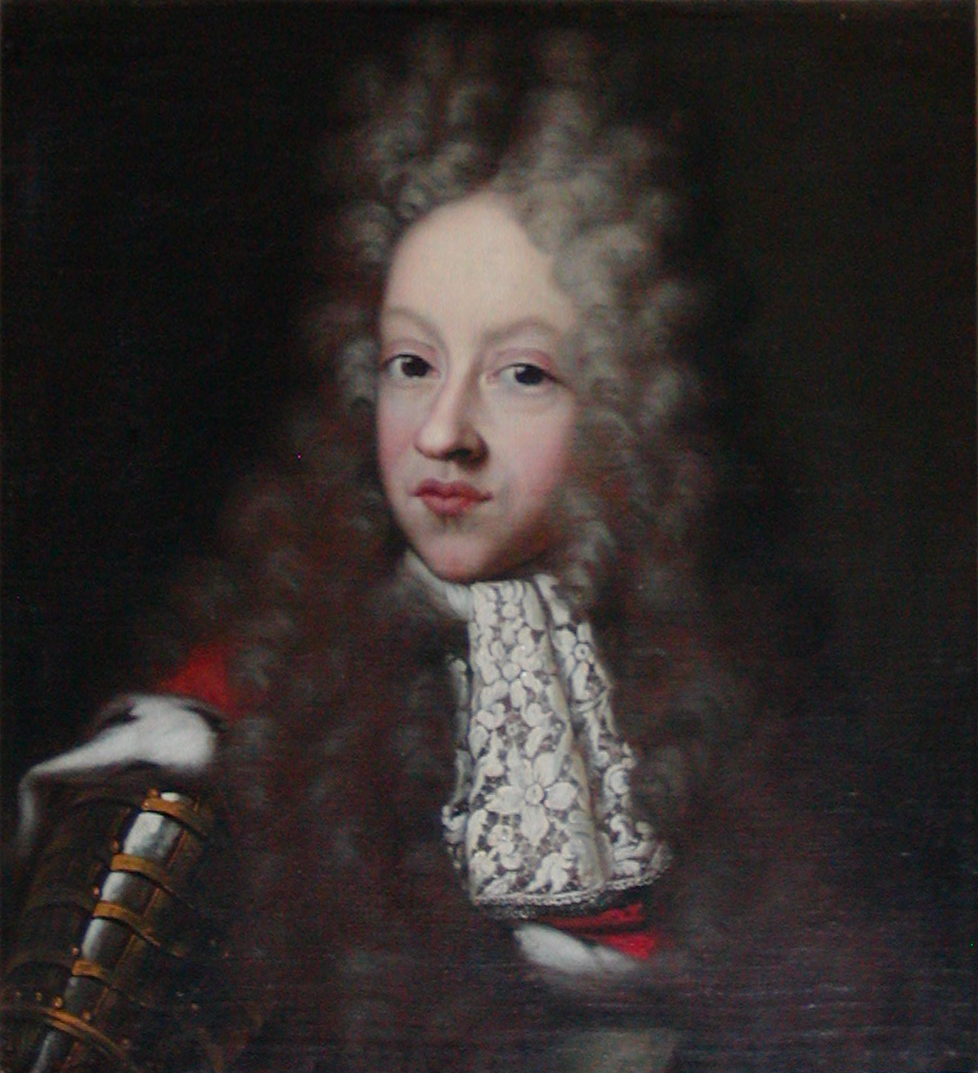
Prince Christian of Denmark (1675–1695) died 27 June

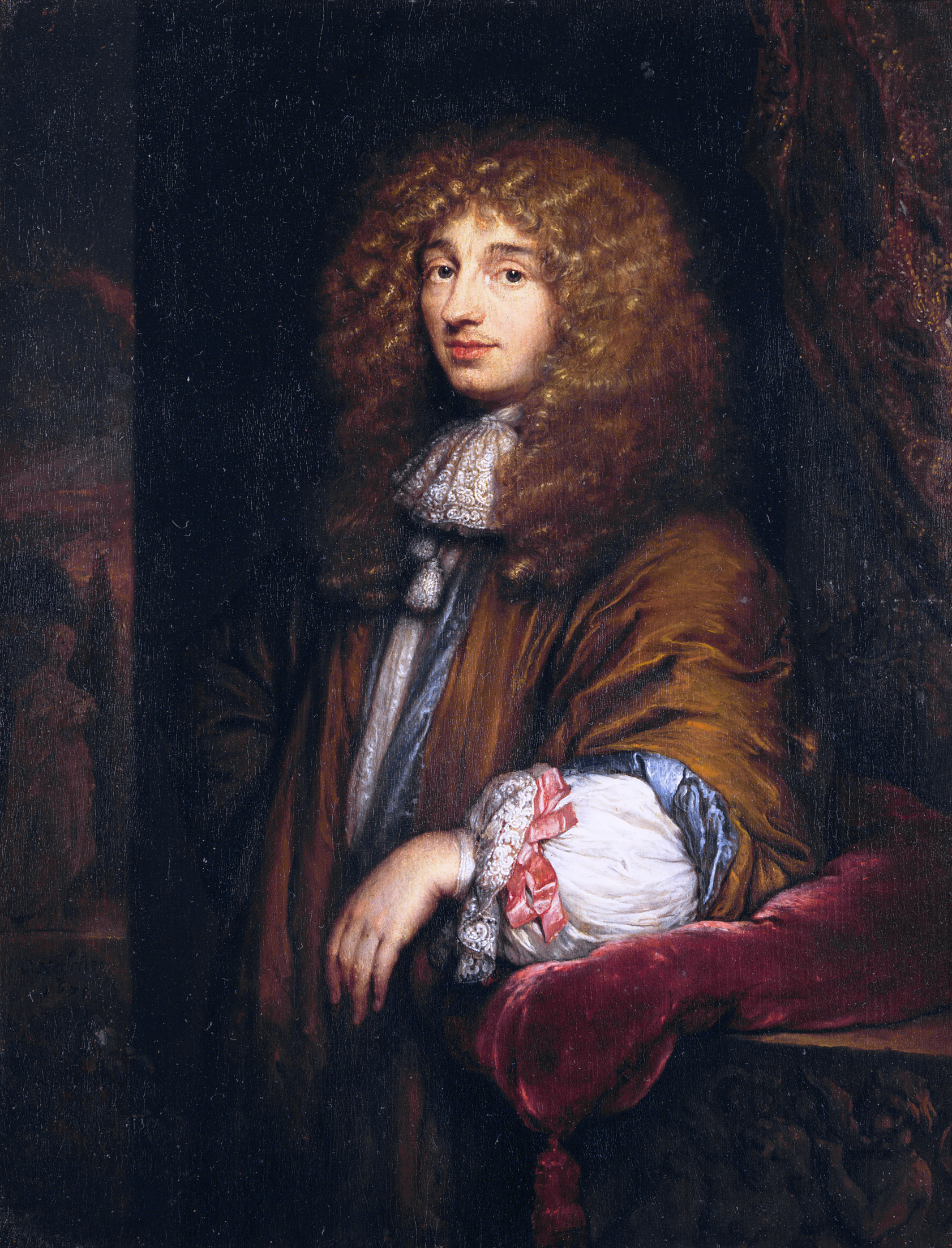
Christiaan Huygens died 8 July

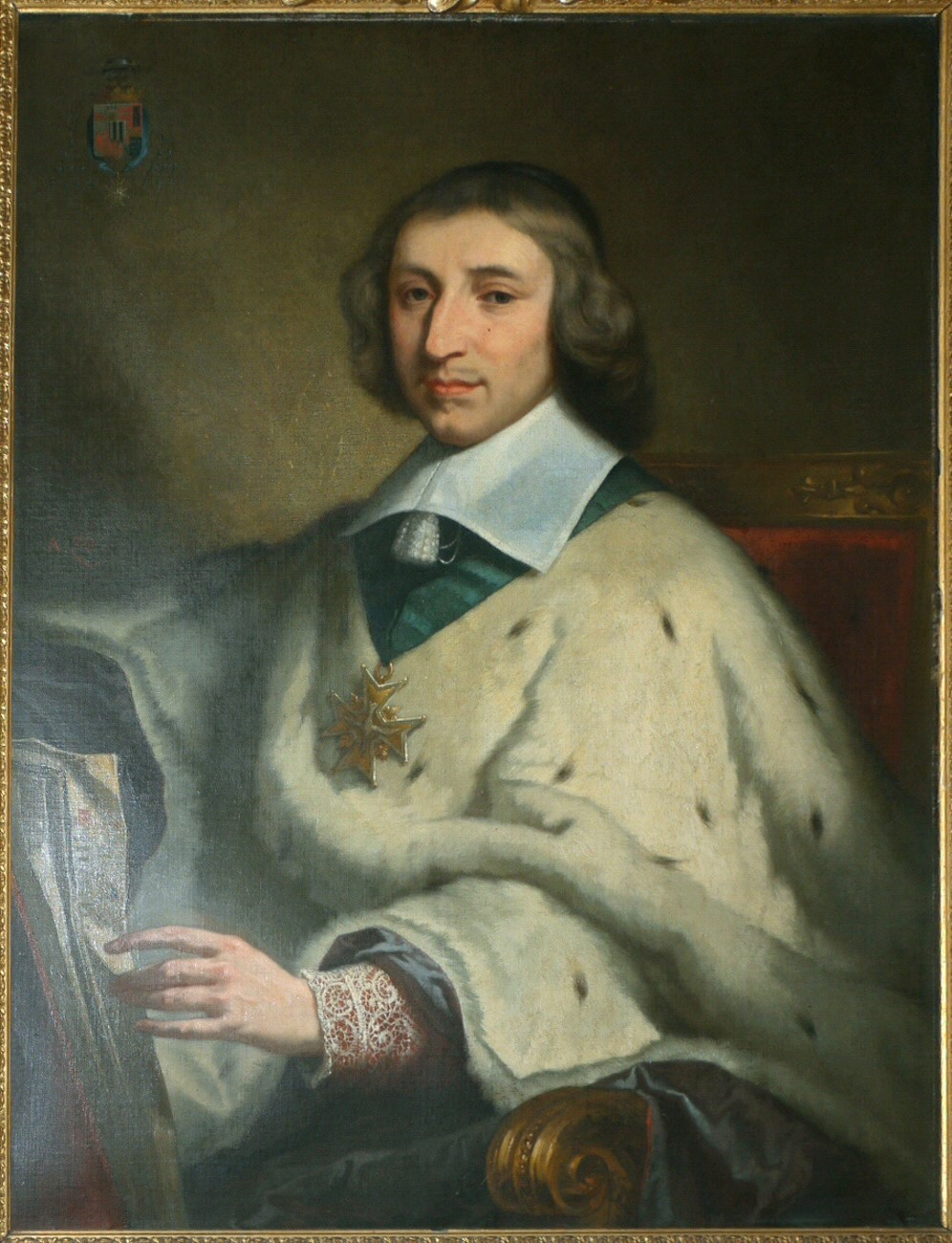
François de Harlay de Champvallon died 6 August

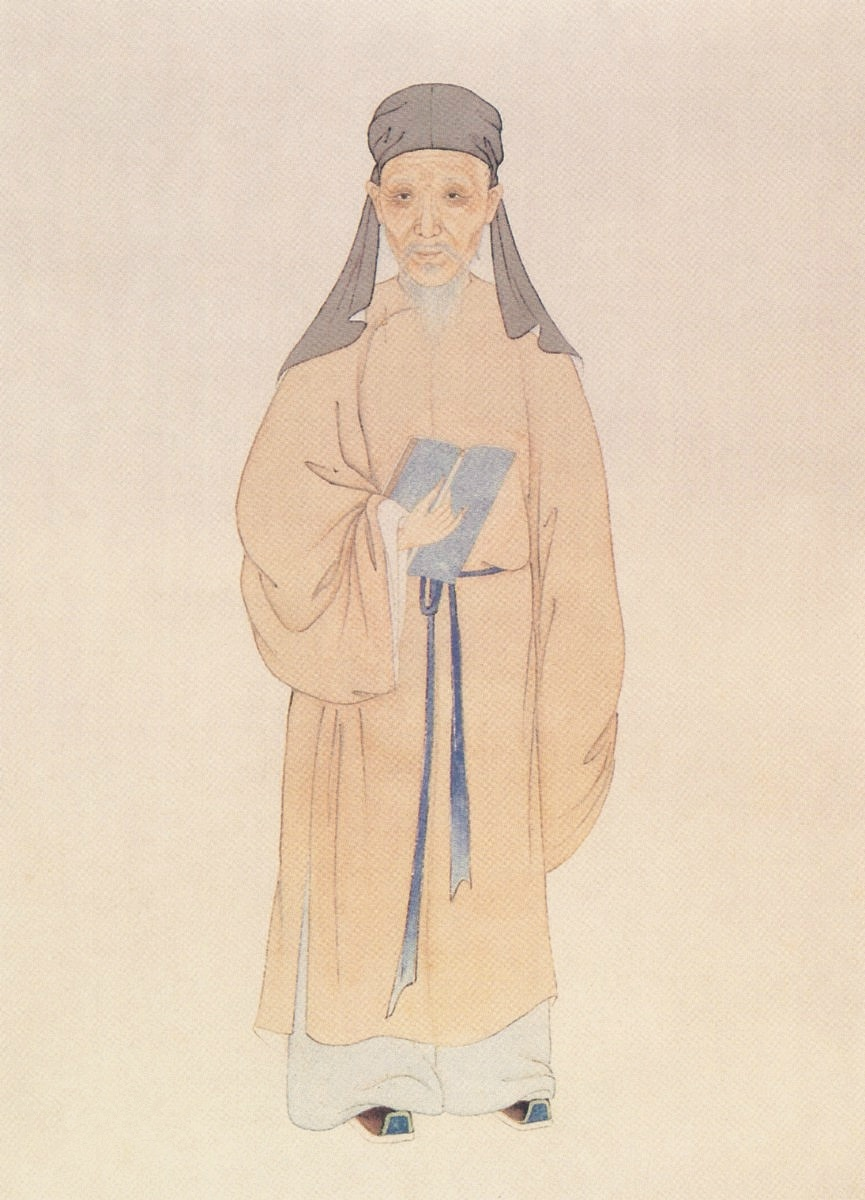
Huang Zongxi died 12 August

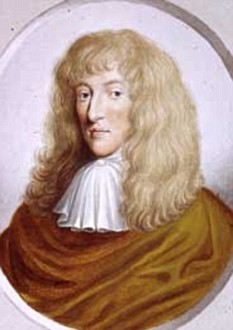
Christopher Merret died 19 August

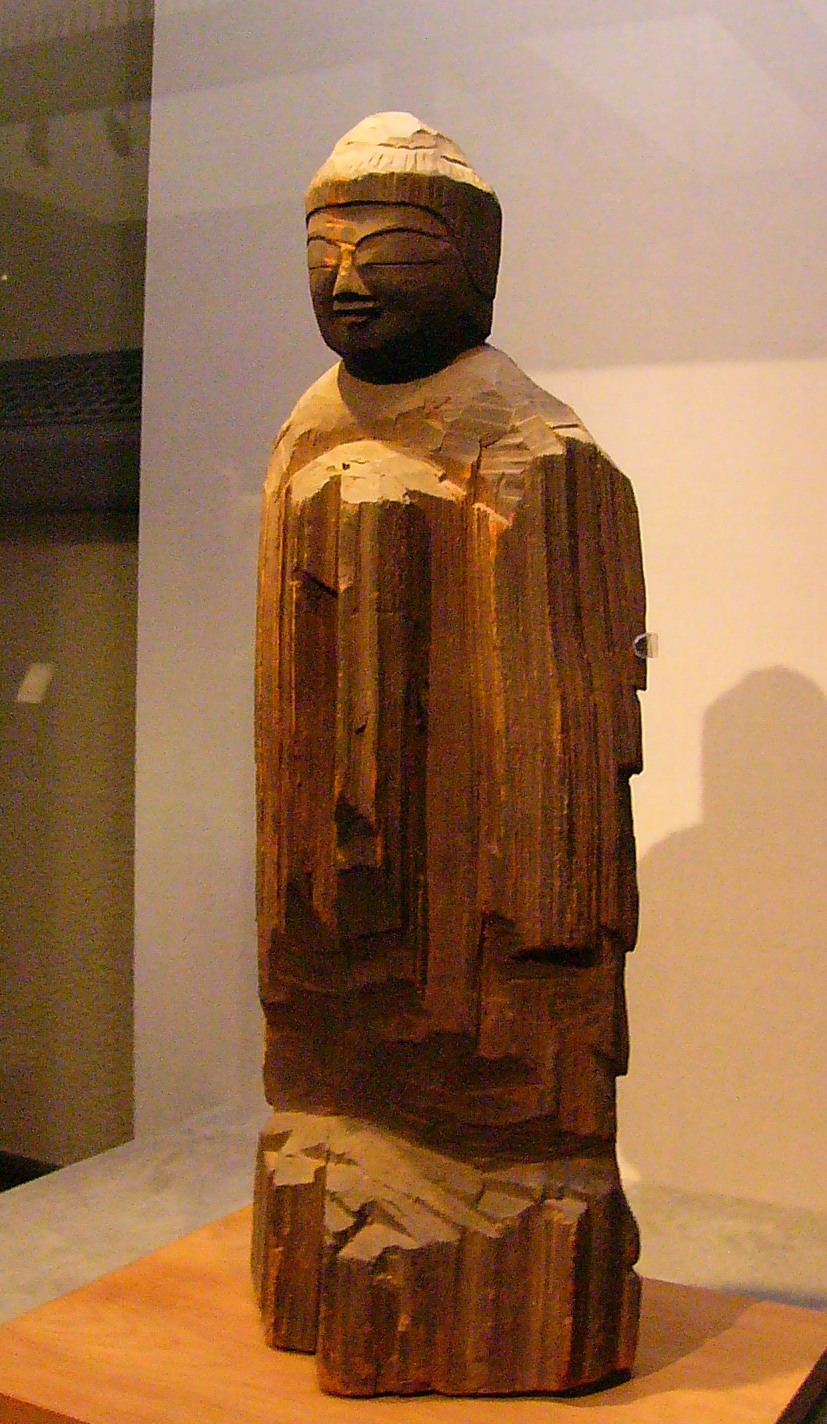
Enkū died 24 August

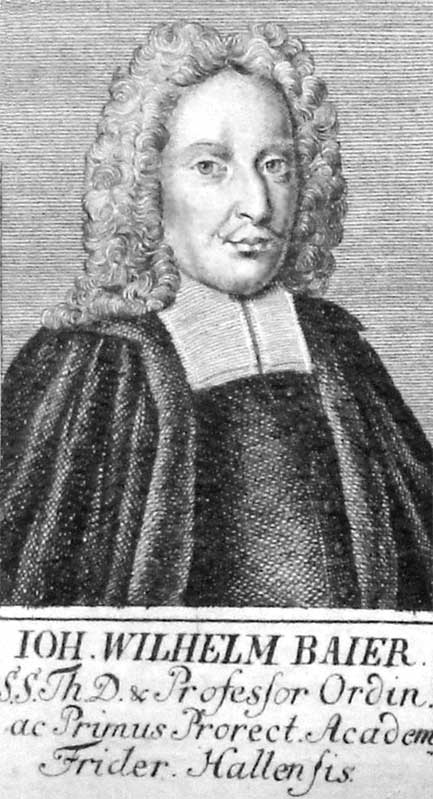
Johann Wilhelm Baier died 19 October

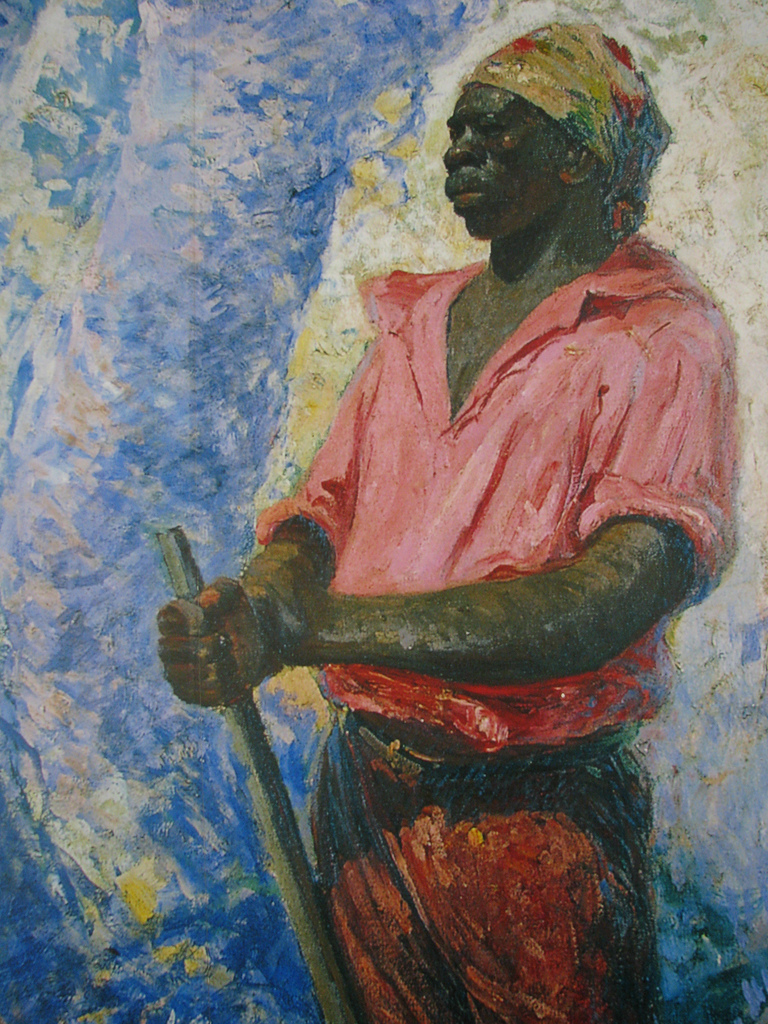
Zumbi died 20 November

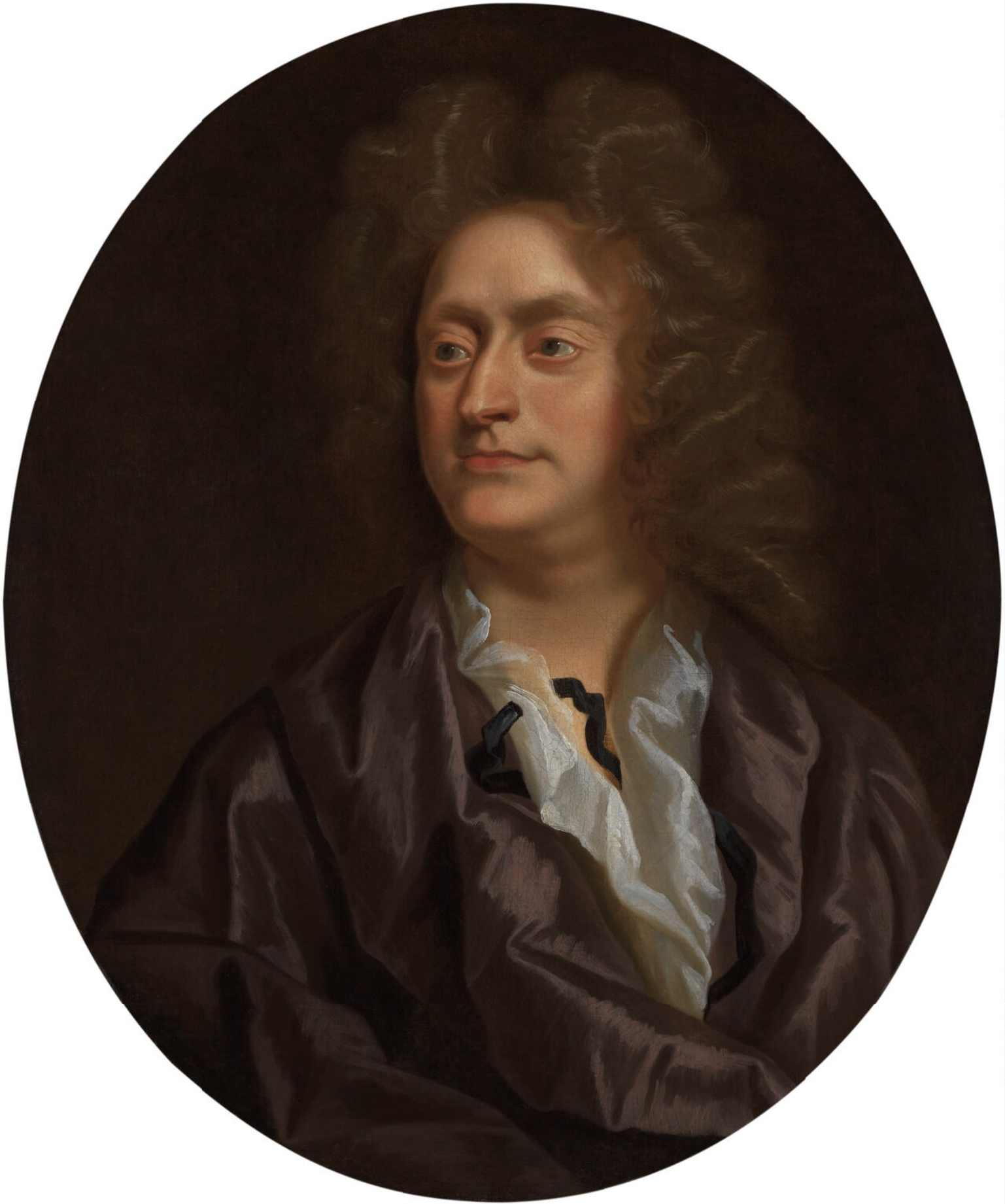
Henry Purcell died 21 November

=== January–March ===
- January 4 – François-Henri de Montmorency, duc de Luxembourg, Marshal of France (b. 1628)
- January 6 – Christian Albert, Duke of Holstein-Gottorp, Duke of Schleswig-Holstein-Gottorp (b. 1641)
- January 11 – Nizel Rivers, Member of Parliament of England (b. 1614)
- January 16 – Hans Adam Weissenkircher, Austrian painter (b. 1646)
- January 26 – Johann Jakob Wepfer, Swiss pathologist (b. 1620)
- January 27 – Francesco Nasini, Italian painter (b. 1611)
- January 29
  - Paul Hermann, German botanist (b. 1646)
  - Diego Sarmiento Valladares, Spanish bishop (b. 1611)
- February 6 – Ahmed II, Sultan of the Ottoman Empire from 1691 to 1695 (b. 1643)
- February 11
  - John Bennet, 1st Baron Ossulston, English politician (b. 1616)
  - Abraham Hinckelmann, German theologian (b. 1652)
- February 14 – Georg von Derfflinger, field marshal in the army of Brandenburg-Prussia (b. 1606)
- February 18 – Sir William Phips, First royal governor of the Province of Massachusetts Bay (b. 1651)
- February 24 – Johann Ambrosius Bach, German musician, father to Johann Sebastian Bach (b. 1645)
- March 4 – Philip Sherard, English politician (b. 1623)
- March 5 – Henry Wharton, English writer (b. 1664)
- March 6 – Everhard Jabach, German private banker (b. 1618)
- March 12 – Cristoval Royas de Spinola, Spanish bishop and diplomat (b. 1626)
- March 15 – Rutger von Langerfeld, Dutch painter and architect (b. 1635)
- March 23 – Adam Perelle, French draughtsman and painter (b. 1640)
- March 25 – Ludwika Karolina Radziwiłł, margravine consort of Brandenburg (b. 1667)
- March 26
  - George Nevill, 12th Baron Bergavenny, English noble (b. 1665)
  - Jan Karol Opaliński, Polish starost and kasztelan of Poznań (b. 1642)
- March 28 – William Douglas, 1st Duke of Queensberry, British politician (b. 1637)
- March 30 – Anselm Franz von Ingelheim, Archbishop of Mainz (b. 1634)

=== April–June ===
- April 3 – Melchior d'Hondecoeter, painter and engraver from the Northern Netherlands (b. 1636)
- April 5 – George Savile, 1st Marquess of Halifax, English writer and statesman (b. 1633)
- April 6 – Richard Busby, English clergyman (b. 1606)
- April 12 – Jean-Baptiste Corneille, French historical painter, etcher, and engraver (b. 1649)
- April 13
  - Petrus Draghi Bartoli, Roman Catholic patriarch (b. 1646)
  - Jean de La Fontaine, French poet, fabulist and writer (b. 1621)
- April 15
  - Christoph Arnold, German astronomer (b. 1650)
  - Claude Lancelot, French monk and grammarian (b. 1615)
- April 17
  - Juana Inés de la Cruz, Mexican nun, writer, philosopher, composer and poet (b. 1648)
  - Henri Testelin, French painter (b. 1616)
- April 20 – Georg Caspar Wecker, German composer (b. 1632)
- April 23
  - Petronella Dunois, Dutch art collector (b. 1650)
  - Henry Vaughan, Welsh author, physician and metaphysical poet (b. 1621)
- April 27 – John Trenchard, English politician (b. 1649)
- April 29 – Jan Karol Dolski, Polish-Lithuanian noble (b. 1637)
- April 30 – Ikegusuku Anken, sanshikan of Ryukyu (b. 1635)
- May 1 – Goeku Chōsei, sanshikan of Ryukyu (b. 1621)
- May 5 – Daniel Brevint, Jersey writer and clergyman (b. 1616)
- May 9 – Lambert van Haven, Danish-Norwegian architect (b. 1630)
- May 15 – Patrick Lyon, 3rd Earl of Strathmore and Kinghorne, Scottish peer (b. 1643)
- May 17 – Cornelis de Heem, Dutch painter (b. 1631)
- May 24 – Matsudaira Yorishige, daimyo of the early Edo period; 1st lord of Takamatsu (b. 1622)
- May 29
  - Sürmeli Ali Pasha, Ottoman grand vizier (b. 1645)
  - Giuseppe Recco, Italian painter (b. 1634)
- May 30
  - Andreas Albinowski, Roman Catholic prelate, Auxiliary Bishop of Włocławek (1695– (b. 1640)
  - Pierre Mignard, French painter (b. 1612)
- June 3 – Philip Aranda, Spanish Jesuit theologian (b. 1642)
- June 7 – Elias Rudolph Camerarius Sr., German physician (b. 1641)
- June 11 – André Félibien, French architect (b. 1619)
- June 15 – Jean Dieu de Saint-Jean, French painter (b. 1654)
- June 27 – Prince Christian of Denmark, Danish prince (b. 1675)
- June 29 – Sir Edward Wyndham, 2nd Baronet, politician (b. 1667)

=== July–September ===
- July 8 – Christiaan Huygens, Dutch mathematician and physicist who developed the wave theory of light (b. 1629)
- July 18 – Johannes Camphuys, Governor-General of the Dutch East Indies (b. 1634)
- July 23 – Charles Philip of Brandenburg-Schwedt, Titular Margrave of Brandenburg-Schwedt (b. 1673)
- August 2
  - Mattia de Rossi, Italian painter (b. 1637)
  - Gabriel Tammelin, Lutheran clergyman (b. 1641)
- August 6
  - François de Harlay de Champvallon, Roman Catholic archbishop of Paris (b. 1625)
  - Thomas Moore, English politician (b. 1618)
- August 8 – Carel de Vogelaer, Dutch still life painter (b. 1653)
- August 9 – Paulus de Roo, Dutch colonial governor (b. 1658)
- August 12 – Huang Zongxi, Chinese political theorist, philosopher, writer, and soldier (b. 1610)
- August 19
  - Jean-Gilles Delcour, Flemish painter (b. 1632)
  - Christopher Merret, English physician and scientist (b. 1614)
- August 20 – Giuseppe Francesco Borri, Italian alchemist, prophet and doctor (b. 1627)
- August 24 – Enkū, Japanese sculptor and monk (b. 1632)
- August 25 – John Waddon, English politician (b. 1649)
- September – Thomas Tew, English pirate
- September 2 – Giovanni Battista Gentile, Roman Catholic bishop (b. 1658)
- September 15 – Giacomo de Angelis, Catholic cardinal (b. 1610)
- September 17 – Henry Newcome, English nonconformist preacher (b. 1627)
- September 22 – George Carteret, 1st Baron Carteret, English baron (b. 1667)
- September 23 – Karl II von Liechtenstein-Kastelkorn, Prince-Bishop of Olomouc (b. 1623)

=== October–December ===
- October 6 – Gustav Adolph, Duke of Mecklenburg-Güstrow, last Administrator of Ratzeburg (b. 1633)
- October 10 – Tommaso de Rosa, Roman Catholic prelate, Bishop of Policastro and Bishop of Sant'Angelo dei Lombardi e Bisaccia (b. 1621)
- October 13 – Ephrem de Nevers, French missionary (b. 1603)
- October 16 – William Wentworth, 2nd Earl of Strafford, member of England's House of Lords (b. 1626)
- October 17 – Arthur Rawdon, Irish botanist and politician (b. 1662)
- October 19 – Johann Wilhelm Baier, German theologian (b. 1647)
- October 21
  - Johann Arnold Nering, German architect (b. 1659)
  - Teofilo Testa, Roman Catholic prelate, Bishop of Tropea (b. 1631)
- October 29 – Barrington Bourchier, Member of Parliament (b. 1627)
- November 3 – Charles Hutchinson, English politician (b. 1636)
- November 8 – Giovanni Paolo Colonna, Italian composer (b. 1637)
- November 10 – Charles Legardeur de Tilly (b. 1616)
- November 13 – William Byron, 3rd Baron Byron, British Baron (b. 1636)
- November 16 – Pierre Nicole, French Jansensist (b. 1625)
- November 19 – Sir John Guise, 2nd Baronet, English Member of Parliament (b. 1650)
- November 20 – Zumbi, Brazilian leader of a runaway slave colony (b. 1655)
- November 21 – Henry Purcell, English composer (b. 1659)
- November 22 – Francis Nurse, husband of Rebecca Nurse, (accused during the Salem Witch Trials of 1692), (b. 1618)
- November 28
  - Jan Sladký Kozina, Czech revolutionary (b. 1652)
  - Anthony Wood, English antiquarian (b. 1632)
- November 29 – James Dalrymple, 1st Viscount Stair, Scottish lawyer and statesman (b. 1619)
- November 30 – Giacomo Cantelli, Italian cartographer (b. 1643)
- December 7 – Giuseppe Spinucci, Roman Catholic bishop (b. 1617)
- December 8
  - Barthélemy d'Herbelot de Molainville, French orientalist (b. 1625)
  - Mariana of the Purification, Nun of the Carmelite Order of the Ancient Observance (b. 1623)
- December 10 – Leonard Bilson, English Member of Parliament (b. 1616)
- December 12 – Jacob Abendana, British rabbi (b. 1630)
- December 14 – William Bond, Speaker of the Massachusetts Province House (b. 1625)
- December 15 – Richard Hampden, English politician; (b. 1631)
- December 16 – Thomas Boylston, American colonist doctor (b. 1644)
- December 17 – Caleb Carr, Rhode Island colonial governor (b. 1624)
- December 20 – David Pohle, German baroque composer (b. 1624)
- December 24
  - Jacob Johan Hastfer, Swedish field marshal (b. 1647)
  - Louis Thomassin, French bishop and theologian (b. 1619)
- December 30 – Samuel Morland, British academic, diplomat and spy (b. 1625)

1696

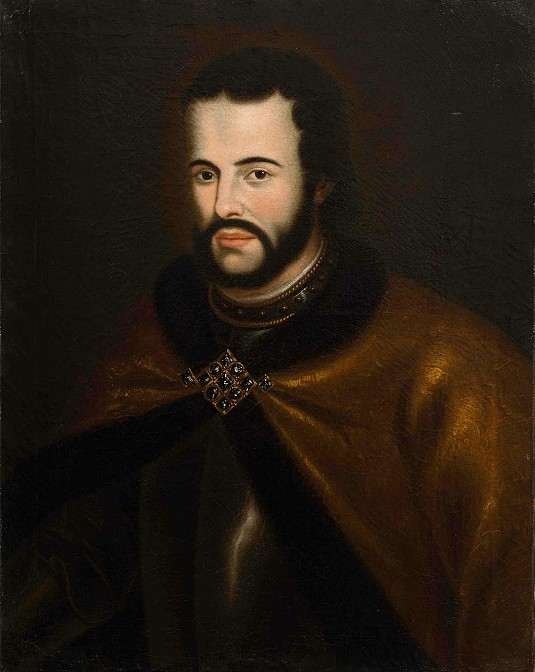
Ivan V of Russia died 8 February

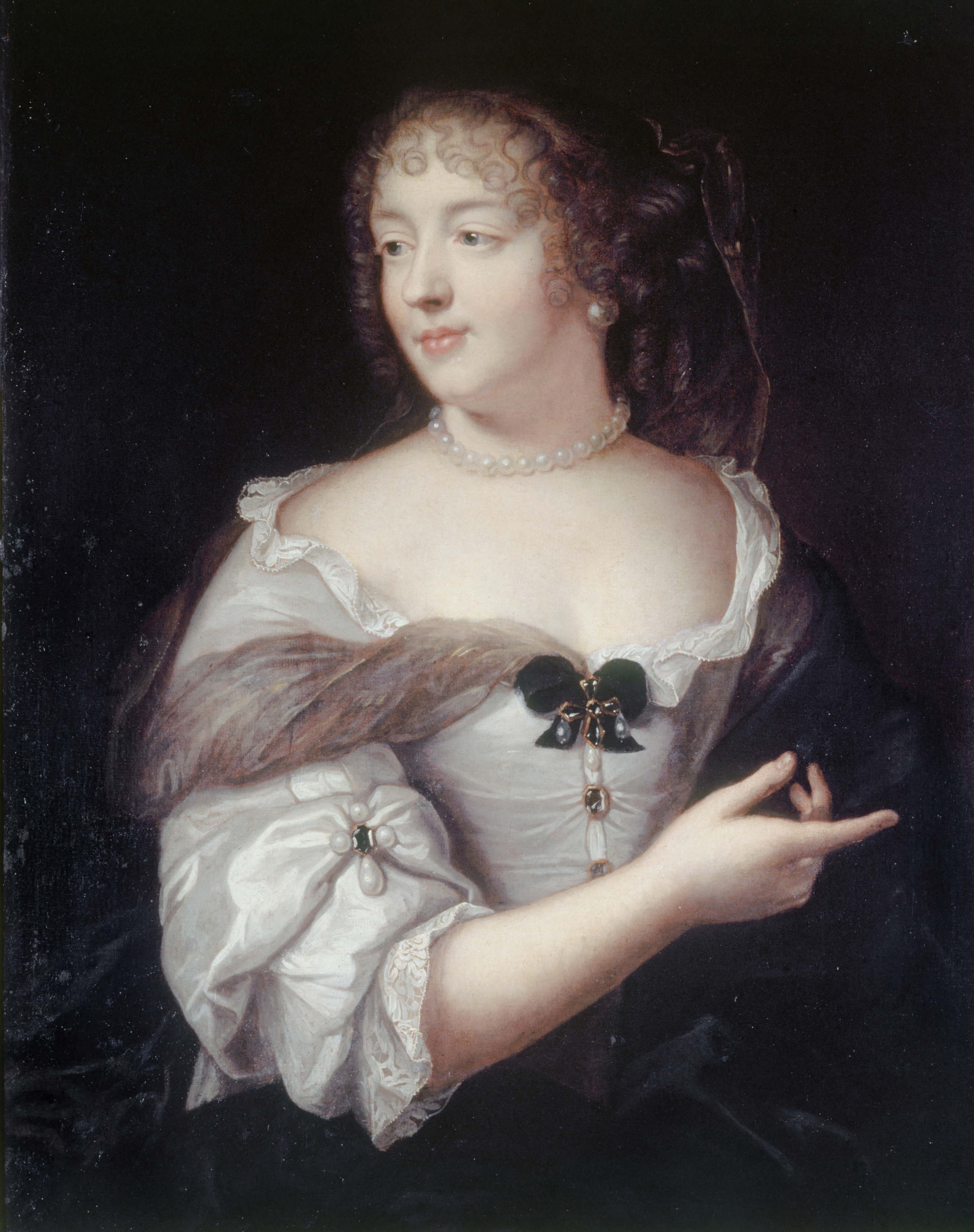
Marie de Rabutin-Chantal, marquise de Sévigné died 17 April

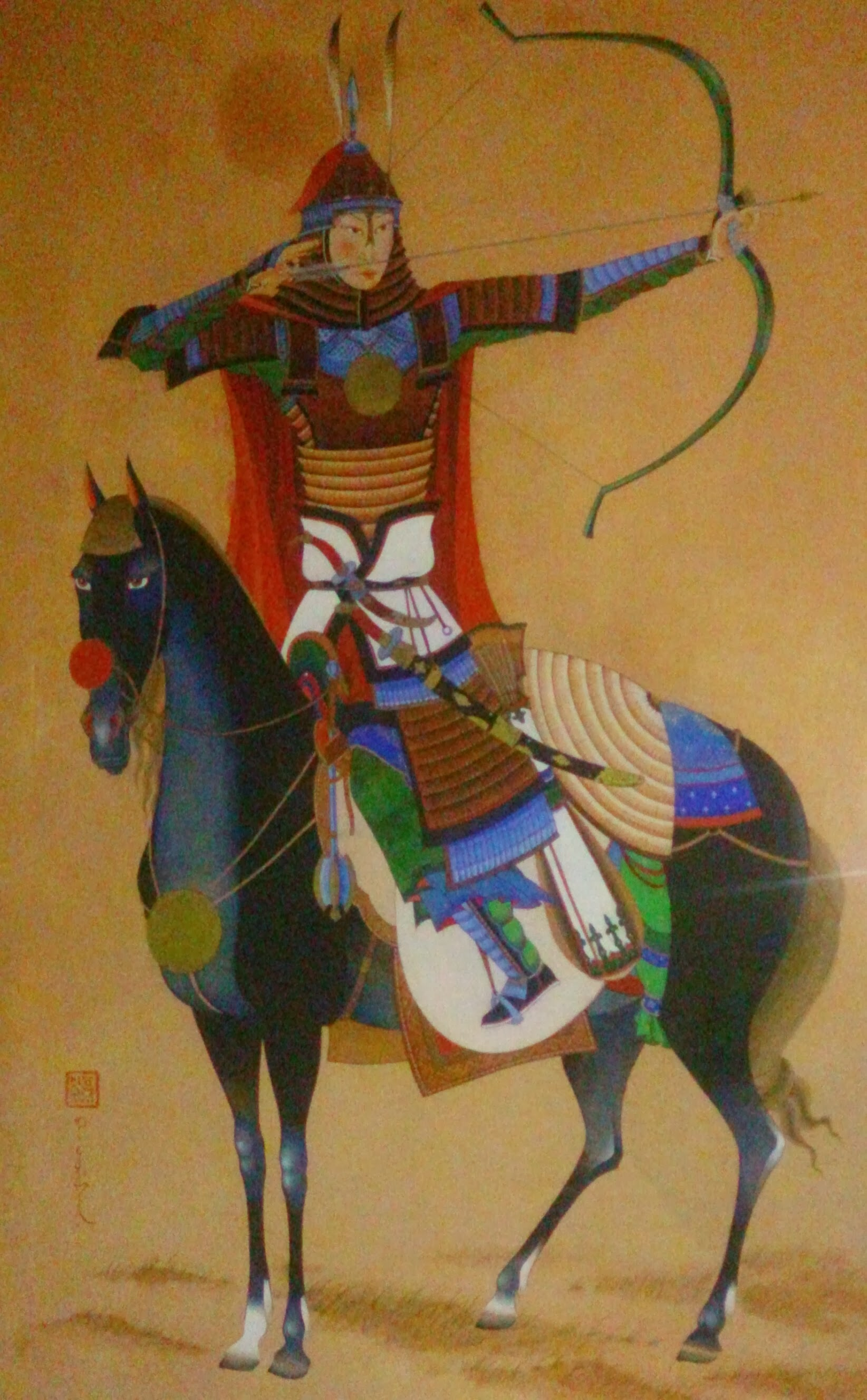
Queen Anu died 12 June

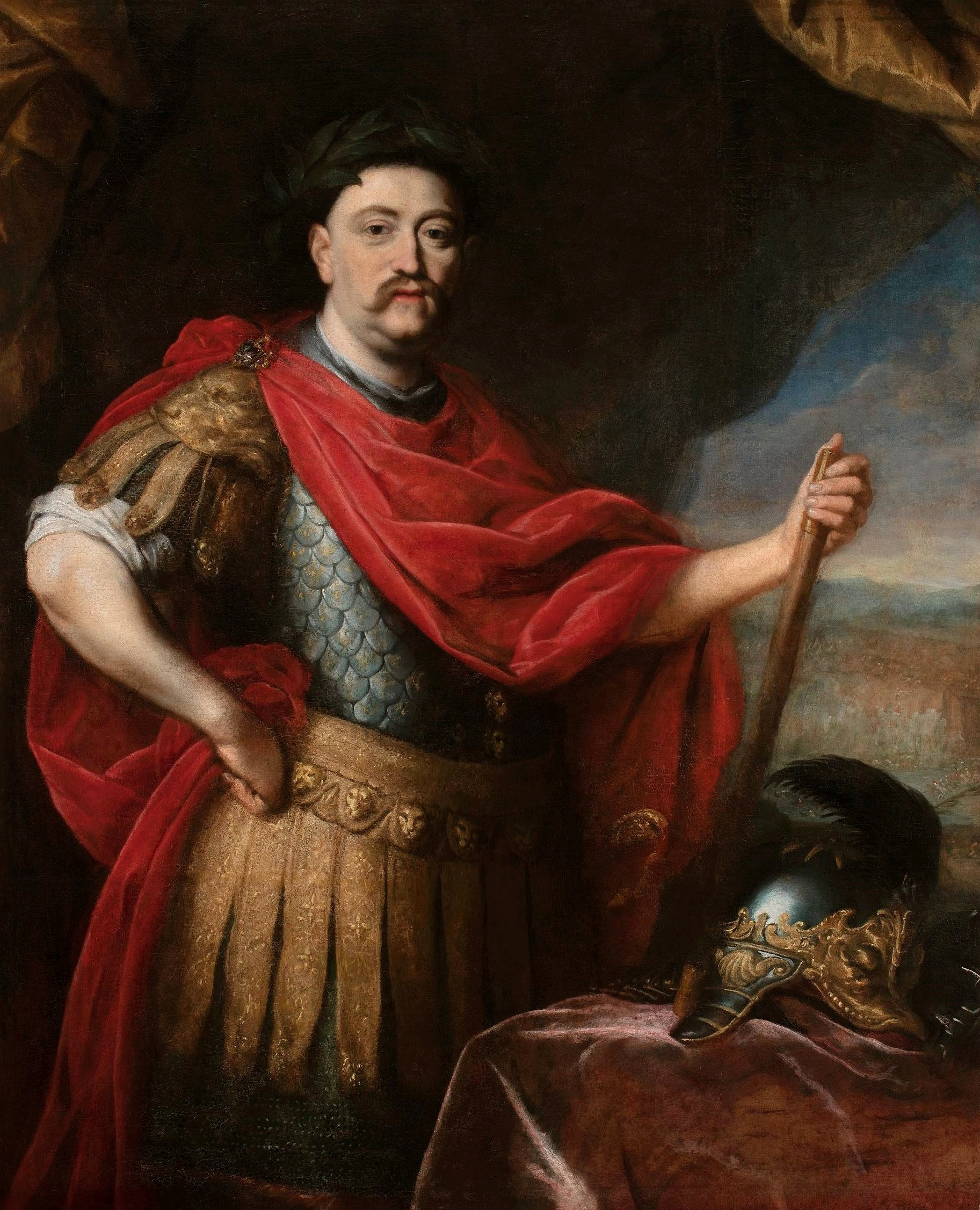
John III Sobieski died 17 June

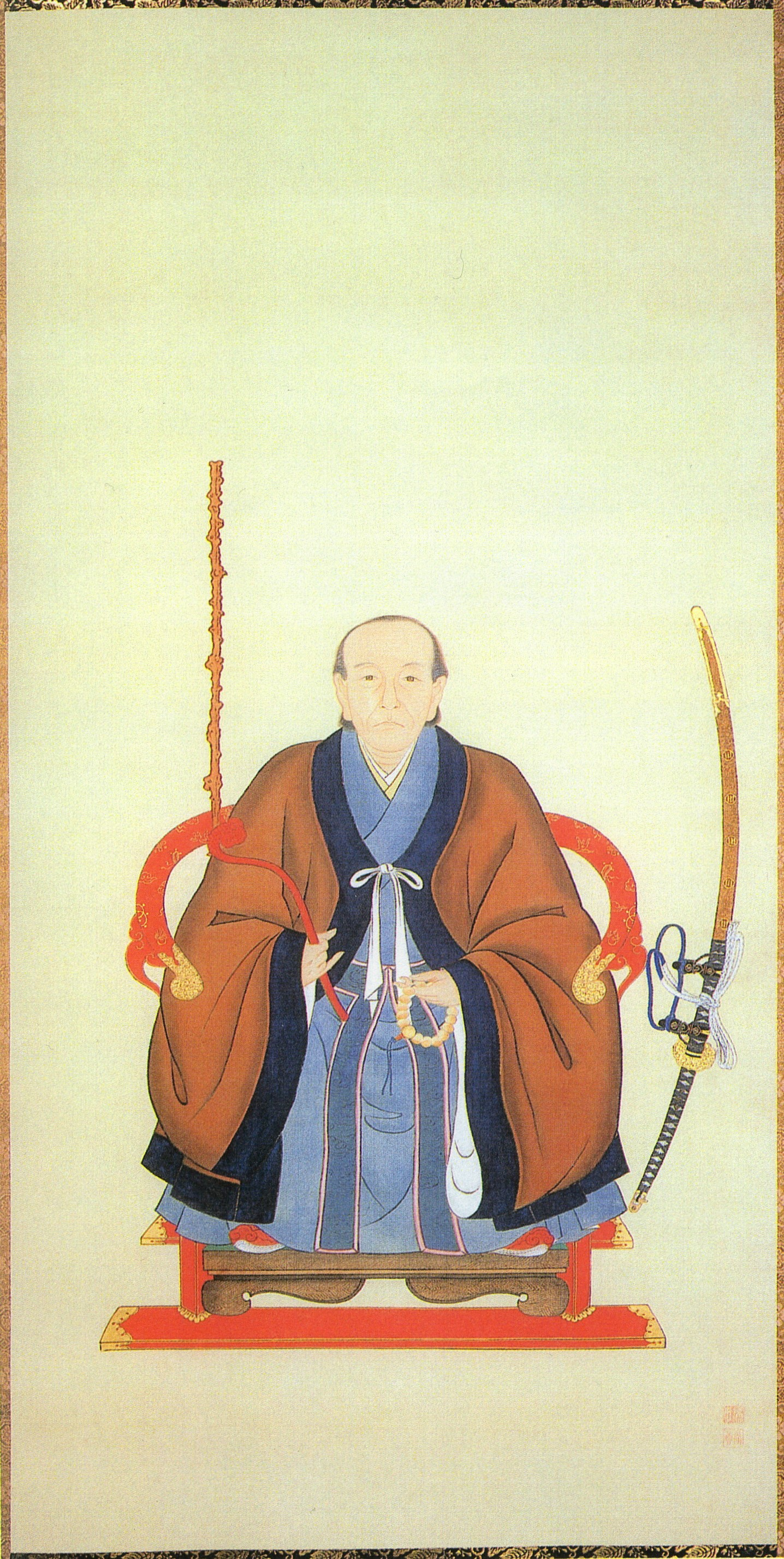
Inaba Masanori died 4 July

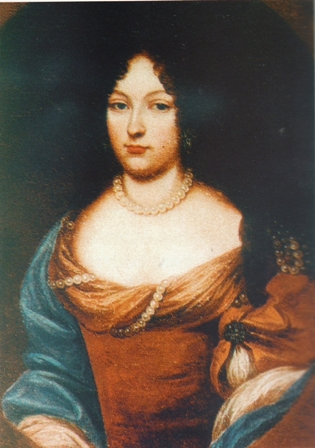
Raugravine Caroline Elisabeth died 7 July

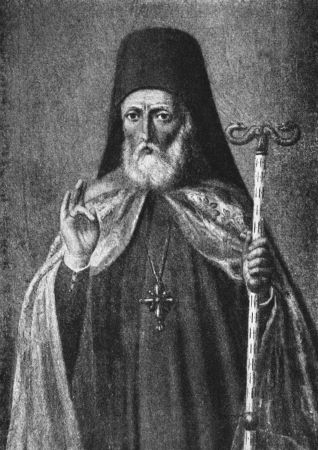
Dionysius III of Constantinople died 14 October

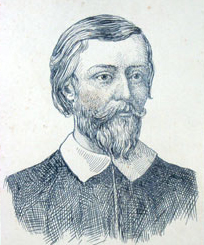
Gregório de Matos died 26 November

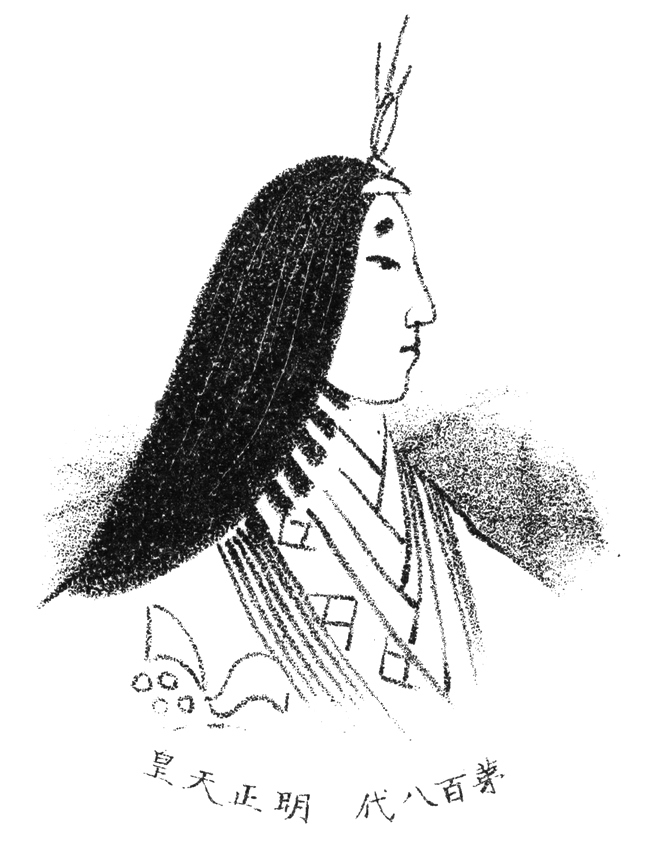
Empress Meishō died 4 December

=== January–March ===
- January 11 – Charles Albanel, French missionary explorer in Canada (b. 1616)
- January 13 – Giovanni Cosimo Bonomo, Italian physician (b. 1666)
- January 15 – Bartholomäus Kilian, German engraver (b. 1630)
- January 21 – Inés de Benigánim, Spanish religious (b. 1625)
- February – Ahom King Supaatphaa or Gadadhar Singha
- February 1 – Molly Verney, British artist (b. 1675)
- February 4 – Philip Wharton, 4th Baron Wharton, English soldier (b. 1613)
- February 8 – Tsar Ivan V of Russia, Tsar of Russia from 1682 to 1696 (b. 1666)
- February 12 – George Bradbury, English judge (b. 1643)
- February 19 – Giovanni Pietro Bellori, Italian painter and biographer (b. 1613)
- March 6 – Mary Knatchbull, Knatchbull, Mary, abbess of the Convent of the Immaculate Conception, Ghent (b. 1610)
- March 8 – Thomas Street, English judge and politician (b. 1625)
- March 9 – Jean de la Vallée, Swedish architect (b. 1620)
- March 14 – Jean Domat, French jurist (b. 1625)
- March 16 – Louis Laneau, French bishop active in the kingdom of Siam (b. 1637)
- March 17 – Élisabeth Marguerite d'Orléans, French noble (b. 1646)
- March 18 – Bonaventure Baron, Irish Friar Minor and scholar (b. 1610)
- March 24
  - Jacqueline Bouette de Blémur, French Benedictine nun and writer (b. 1618)
  - Marie de Miramion, French woman known for her piety (b. 1629)
- March 25 – Henry Casimir II, Prince of Nassau-Dietz, Stadholder of Friesland and Groningen (b. 1657)

=== April–June ===
- April 10 – Springett Penn, Member of the Penn family (b. 1674)
- April 12 – George Corwin, High Sheriff during Salem Witch trials (b. 1666)
- April 14 – Isaac de l'Ostal de Saint-Martin, French botanist (b. 1629)
- April 17 – Marie de Rabutin-Chantal, marquise de Sévigné, French writer (b. 1626)
- April 27 – Simon Foucher, French philosopher (b. 1644)
- April 30 – Robert Plot, British naturalist (b. 1640)
- May 11 – Jean de La Bruyère, French writer and philosopher (b. 1645)
- May 15 – Samuel Appleton, military leader (b. 1625)
- May 16 – Mariana of Austria, Queen consort of Spain (b. 1634)
- May 17 – Antoine d'Aquin, physician (b. 1629)
- May 26 – Countess Albertine Agnes of Nassau, Regent of Friesland, Groningen and Drenthe (1664–1679) (b. 1634)
- May 28 – William Gregory, British judge and politician (b. 1625)
- May 30 – Henry Capell, 1st Baron Capell, First Lord of the British Admiralty (b. 1638)
- May 31 – Heinrich Schwemmer, German music teacher and composer (b. 1621)
- June – Greta Duréel, Swedish noblewoman and bank fraud
- June 2 – William Herbert, 1st Marquess of Powis, English marquess (b. 1626)
- June 9 – Antoine Varillas, French historian (b. 1624)
- June 10 – Charles de Courbon de Blénac, French colonial administrator (b. 1622)
- June 12 – Queen Anu, Mongolian noble (b. 1653)
- June 17
  - Jørgen Bjelke, Officer, nobleman (b. 1621)
  - John III Sobieski, King of Poland and Grand Duke of Lithuania (b. 1629)
  - Emilio Taruffi, Italian painter (b. 1633)
- June 22 – Jacobus Tollius, Dutch classicist (b. 1633)
- June 24 – Philip Henry, English Nonconformist clergyman and diarist (b. 1631)
- June 26 – Alonso Xuárez, Spanish Baroque composer (b. 1640)
- June 28 – Eiler Holck, Danish military officer (b. 1627)
- June 29 – Michel Lambert, French singing master, theorbist and composer (b. 1610)

=== July–September ===
- July 4 – Inaba Masanori, daimyo (b. 1623)
- July 6 – Hector d'Andigné de Grandfontaine, Governor of Acadia from 1670 to 1673 (b. 1627)
- July 7 – Raugravine Caroline Elisabeth (b. 1659)
- July 11 – William Godolphin, English diplomat for Charles II and Member of Parliament (b. 1635)
- July 22 – Hendrik van Minderhout, Flemish painter (b. 1632)
- July 25 – Clamor Heinrich Abel, German Baroque composer, violinist and organist (b. 1634)
- July 28
  - Charles Colbert, marquis de Croissy, French politician and diplomat (b. 1629)
  - Sir Bourchier Wrey, 4th Baronet, English politician (b. 1653)
- August 2 – Robert Campbell of Glenlyon, Scottish military commander at the Massacre of Glencoe (b. 1630)
- August 9 – Wacław Potocki, Polish noble (b. 1621)
- August 14 – Sir John Barker, 4th Baronet, English politician, born 1655 (b. 1655)
- August 22 – Robert Austen, politician (b. 1642)
- August 28 – Hans Adam von Schöning, German general (b. 1641)
- September 1 – Donat John, Count Heissler of Heitersheim, Austrian general (b. 1648)
- September 4 – Celestino Sfondrati, Italian Catholic cardinal (b. 1644)
- September 5 – Henry Albin, English minister (b. 1624)
- September 7 – John Powell, Welsh judge; (b. 1633)
- September 9 – Princess Eleonore Erdmuthe of Saxe-Eisenach, Margravine of Brandenburg-Ansbach and Electress of Saxony (b. 1662)
- September 13 – Caleb Banks, English politician (b. 1659)
- September 17 – Daniel Danielis, Belgian composer (b. 1635)
- September 21 – Charles de Montsaulnin, Comte de Montal, 17th century French military officer and noble (b. 1619)
- September 23 – Dionysius IV of Constantinople, Ecumenical Patriarch (b. 1620)
- September 24 – Sir Ralph Verney, 1st Baronet, of Middle Claydon, English Baronet (b. 1613)
- September 28 – Archduchess Maria Theresa of Austria, Austrian archduchess, daughter of Leopold I (b. 1684)
- September 29 – Íñigo Melchor de Velasco, 7th Duke of Frías, Spanish governor of The Netherlands (b. 1629)

=== October–December ===
- October 3 – Prospero Intorcetta, Italian Jesuit missionary (b. 1625)
- October 9 – Charles La Tourasse, French colonial Governor (b. 1630)
- October 14 – Dionysius III of Constantinople, Ecumenical Patriarch of Constantinople (b. 1615)
- October 17
  - Giovanni Battista Boccabadati (b. 1635)
  - Geoffrey Shakerley, English politician (b. 1619)
- October 22 – James Ramsay, Minister of the Church of Scotland, Bishop of Dunblane, Bishop of Ross (b. 1624)
- October 30 – Andrea de Rossi, Roman Catholic archbishop (b. 1644)
- November 26
  - Sir Richard Atkins, 2nd Baronet, English politician (b. 1654)
  - Gregório de Matos, Brazilian poet and lawyer (b. 1636)
- December 4 – Empress Meishō, empress of Japan (b. 1624)
- December 8 – Charles Porter, Irish politician (b. 1631)
- December 12
  - Johan Caspar von Cicignon, Danish/Luxembourgian military officer (b. 1625)
  - John Hampden, English politician, died 1696 (b. 1653)
- December 13 – Georg Matthäus Vischer, Austrian cartographer (b. 1628)
- December 15 – Sir John Knatchbull, 2nd Baronet, English politician (b. 1634)
- December 21 – Louise Moillon, French painter (b. 1610)
- December 23 – Sir William Williams, 6th Baronet, Welsh politician and landowner (c. 1668–96) (b. 1660)
- December 28 – Miguel de Molinos, Spanish priest, apostle of Quietism (b. 1628)
- December 31 – Samuel Annesley, Puritan/nonconformist pastor (b. 1620)
- date unknown – Daibhidh Ó Duibhgheannáin (b. 1651)

1697

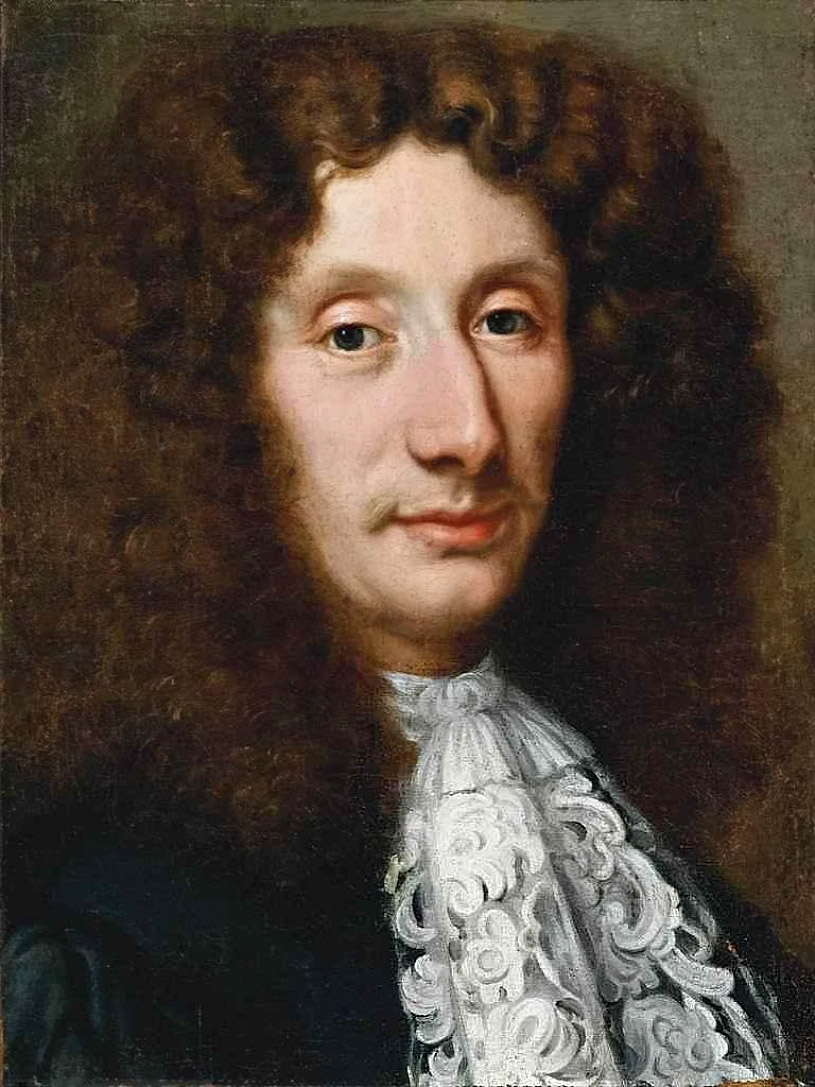
Francesco Redi died 1 March

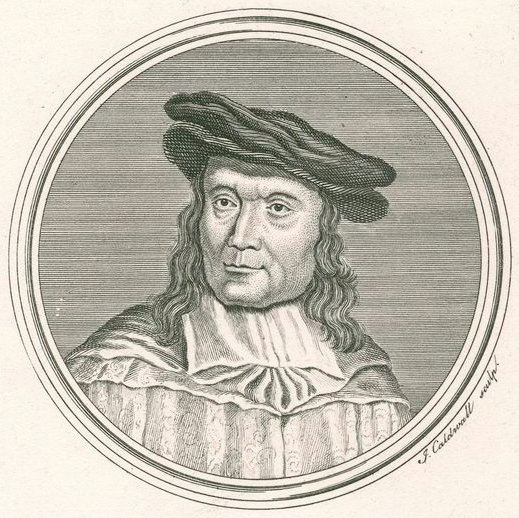
William Child died 23 March

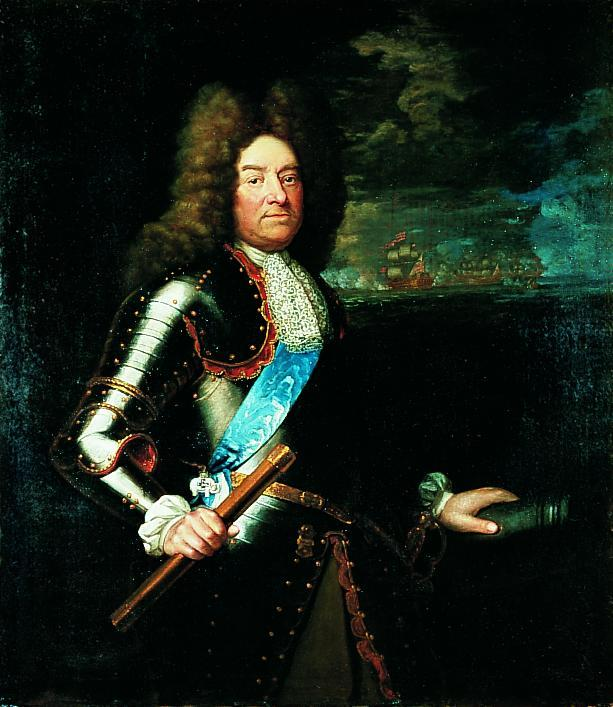
Niels Juel died 8 April

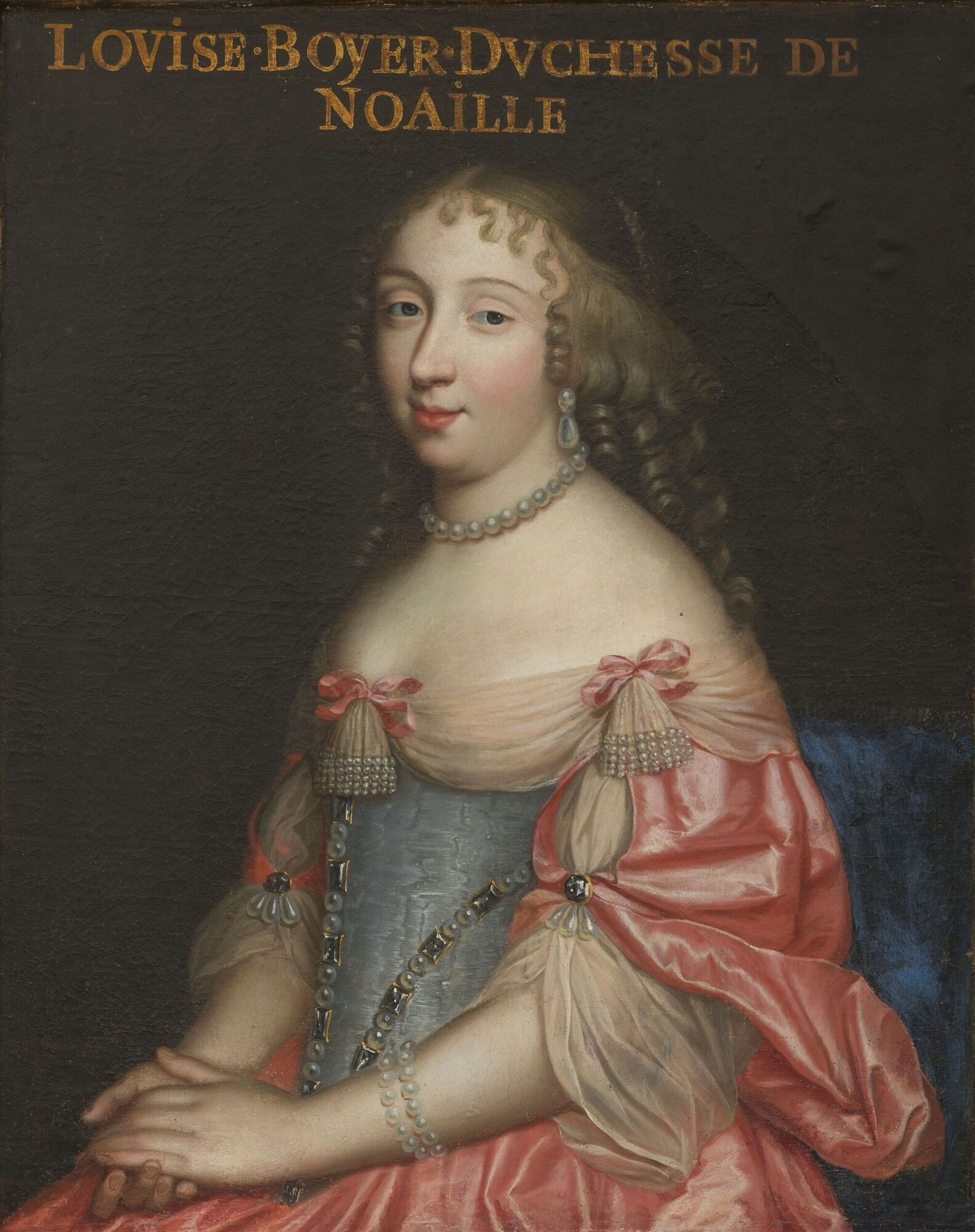
Louise Boyer died 22 May

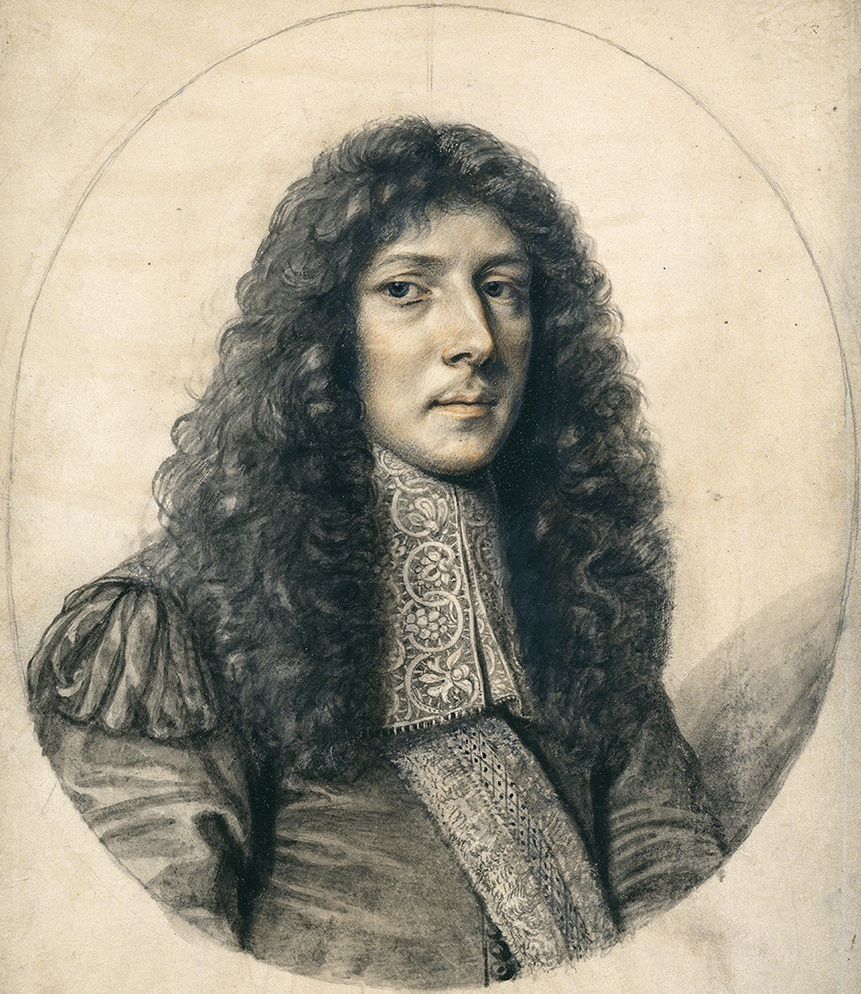
John Aubrey died 7 June

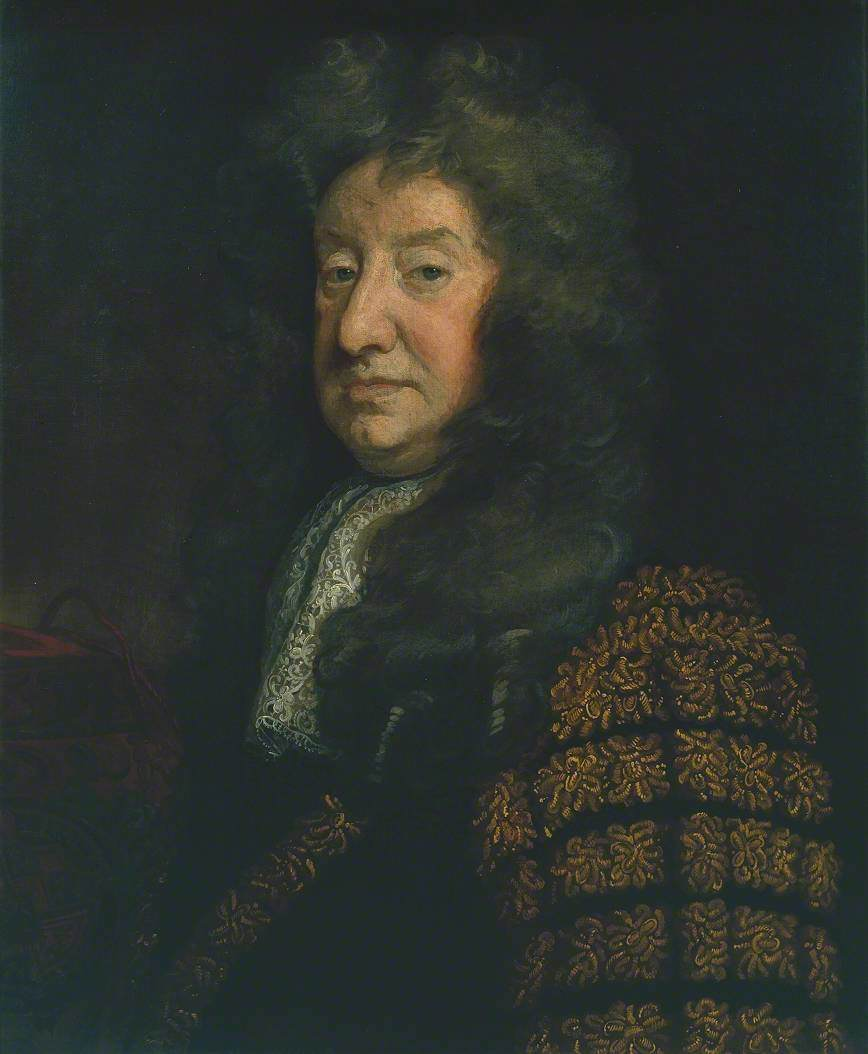
John Hay, 1st Marquess of Tweeddale died 11 August

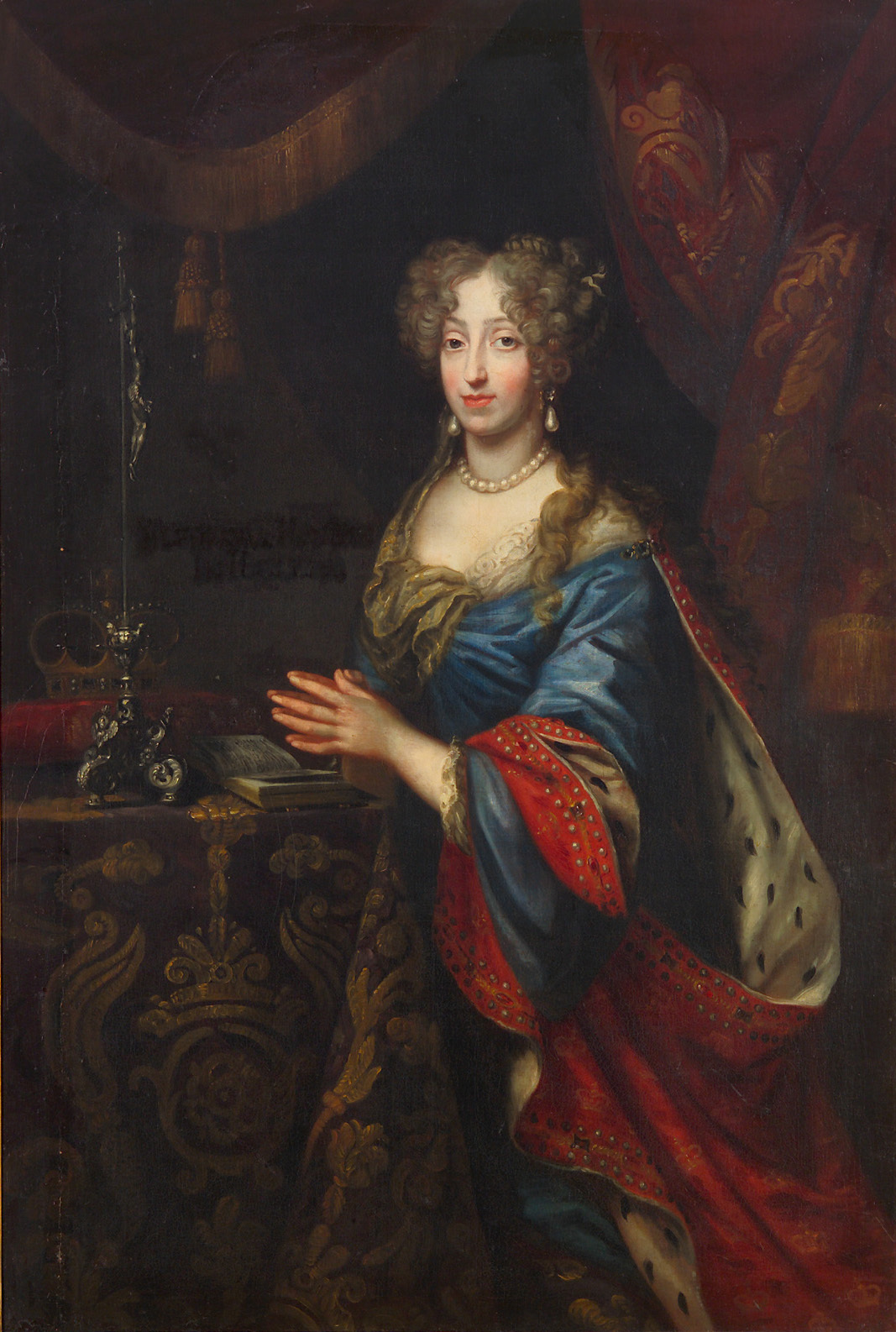
Eleonore of Austria, Queen of Poland died 17 December

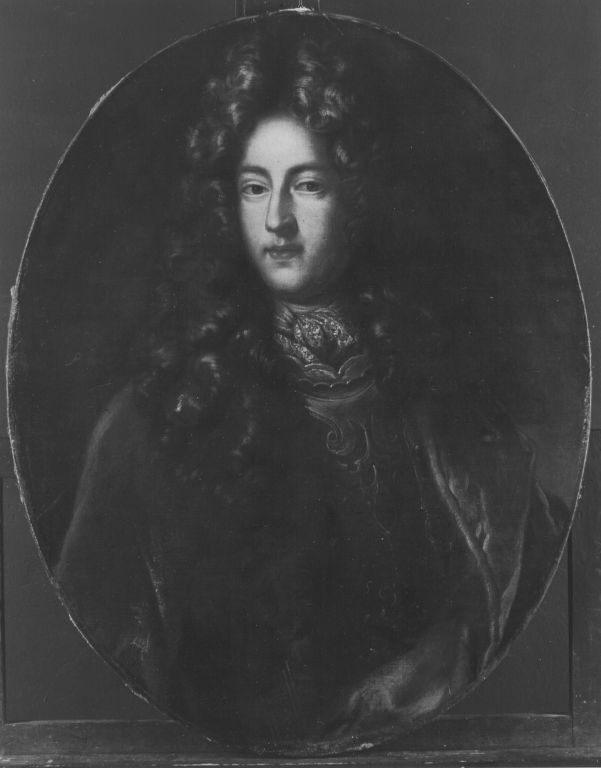
Frederick Charles, Duke of Württemberg-Winnental died 20 December

=== January–March ===
- February 16 – Jan Six van Chandelier, Dutch Golden Age poet from Amsterdam (b. 1620)
- March 15 – William Wentworth, follower of John Wheelwright (b. 1616)
- January 8 – Thomas Aikenhead, Scottish student (hanged) (b. c. 1678)
- January 11
  - John Bradstreet, accused "witch" during the Salem Witch Trials (b. 1652)
  - Daniele Giustiniani, Roman Catholic prelate, Bishop of Bergamo (1664–1697) (b. 1615)
- January 12 – Andrzej Stech, Polish painter (b. 1635)
- January 16 – Fortunato Ilario Carafa della Spina, Roman Catholic cardinal (b. 1630)
- January 26 – Georg Mohr, Danish mathematician (b. 1640)
- January 28 – John Fenwick, English conspirator (b. c. 1645)
- January 31 – Anthony Horneck, German clergyman and scholar (b. 1641)
- February 4 – Adrien de Wignacourt, 63rd Prince and Grand Master of the Order of Malta from 1690 to 1697 (b. 1618)
- February 5 – Esaias Fleischer, Danish priest (b. 1633)
- February 11 – Georg Händel, German musician (b. 1622)
- February 16 – Bernardino Plastina, Roman Catholic prelate, Bishop of Oppido Mamertina (b. 1645)
- February 17 – Francis Dane, American colonial priest (b. 1615)
- March 1 – Francesco Redi, Italian physician (b. 1626)
- March 12 – Gaspar de la Cerda, 8th Count of Galve, viceroy of New Spain (b. 1653)
- March 17 – Þórður Þorláksson, Icelandic bishop (b. 1637)
- March 19 – Nicolaus Bruhns, German organist and composer (b. 1665)
- March 23 – William Child, English composer and organist (b. 1606)
- March 26 – Godfrey McCulloch, Scottish politician and murderer (executed) (b. 1640)
- March 27 – Simon Bradstreet, English colonial magistrate (b. 1604)

=== April–June ===
- April 1 – Giyesu, Chinese prince (b. 1646)
- April 4 – Andrea Carlone, Italian painter (b. 1626)
- April 5 – King Charles XI of Sweden, King of Sweden from 1660 to 1697 (b. 1655)
- April 8 – Niels Juel, Danish admiral (b. 1629)
- April 14 – Custodio do Pinho, Roman Catholic prelate, Titular Bishop of Hierapolis in Isauria (b. 1638)
- May 2 – Simon Henry, Count of Lippe, ruling Count of Lippe-Detmold (b. 1639)
- May 8 – Sir Richard Temple, 3rd Baronet, English Member of Parliament (b. 1634)
- May 9 – Ildefonso Vargas y Abarca, Roman Catholic prelate, Bishop of Comayagua (b. 1633)
- May 12 – Francesco Maria Moles, Roman Catholic prelate, Bishop of Nola (b. 1638)
- May 22 – Louise Boyer, French courtier (b. 1632)
- May 24 – Johann Adolf I, Duke of Saxe-Weissenfels, German duke (b. 1649)
- June 3 – Silvius II Frederick, Duke of Württemberg-Oels (b. 1651)
- June 7 – John Aubrey, English writer and antiquarian (b. 1626)
- June 10 – Francis Pemberton, English judge, Lord Chief Justice of the King's Bench (b. 1624)
- June 12 – Ann Baynard, English natural philosopher (b. 1672)
- June 18 – Gregorio Barbarigo, Italian Catholic saint (b. 1625)
- June 19 – Henry Mordaunt, 2nd Earl of Peterborough, English diplomat (b. 1621)
- June 21 – Joseph Anthelmi, French ecclesiastical historian (b. 1648)

=== July–September ===
- July 5 – Sebastijan Glavinić, Catholic bishop (b. 1630)
- July 7 – John Eachard, English divine and satirist (b. 1636)
- July 10 – Katherine Ross, née Collace (c.1635–1697), memoirist and schoolmistress (b. 1635)
- July 11 – Frances Ward, 6th Baroness Dudley, English baroness (b. 1611)
- July 13 – James Draper, early settler of the Massachusetts Bay Colony (b. 1618)
- July 16 – Sir John Brownlow, 3rd Baronet, English politician (b. 1659)
- July 18
  - Thomas Dolman, English politician (b. 1622)
  - António Vieira, Portuguese writer (b. 1608)
- July 20 – Jan Kazimierz Denhoff, Polish cardinal from 1686 (b. 1649)
- July 24 – William Digges, politician in the Colony of Virginia, councillor in the Province of Maryland (b. 1651)
- July 25 – John Grout, military officer (b. 1643)
- July 27
  - Tun Habib Abdul Majid, Grand Vizier of Johor (b. 1637)
  - Dominik Mikołaj Radziwiłł, Polish–Lithuanian noble and politician (b. 1643)
- July 30 – Lorentz Mortensen Angell, Norwegian merchant and landowner (b. 1626)
- August 2
  - Giuseppe Bologna, Roman Catholic prelate, Archbishop of Capua, Archbishop of Benevento (b. 1634)
  - Sir William Frankland, 1st Baronet, English politician (b. 1640)
- August 5 – Jean-Baptiste de Santeul, French poet who wrote in Latin (b. 1630)
- August 11 – John Hay, 1st Marquess of Tweeddale, Scottish judge (b. 1625)
- August 30 – Daigo Fuyumoto, Japanese noble (b. 1648)
- September 11
  - Elmas Mehmed Pasha, Ottoman statesman, grand vizier from 1695 to 1697 (b. 1661)
  - Agneta Rosenbröijer, Finland Swedish noblewoman (b. 1620)

=== October–December ===
- October 27 – Takehara An'i, bureaucrat of Ryukyu Kingdom (b. 1651)
- October 30 – Thomas Lascelles, English politician (b. 1624)
- November 8 – Samuel Enys, English politician (b. 1611)
- November 22 – Libéral Bruant, French architect (b. c. 1635)
- November 30 – Thomas Crew, 2nd Baron Crew, English politician (b. 1624)
- December 17 – Eleonore of Austria, Queen of Poland (b. 1653)
  - Pietro Leoni, Roman Catholic prelate, Bishop of Verona, Bishop of Ceneda (b. 1637)
- December 20
  - Frederick Charles, Duke of Württemberg-Winnental (b. 1652)
  - Sir Arthur Gore, 1st Baronet, Irish politician (b. 1640)
- December 31 – Lucas Faydherbe, Belgian sculptor and architect (b. 1617)
- date unknown – Karin Thomasdotter, Finnish official (b. 1610)

1698

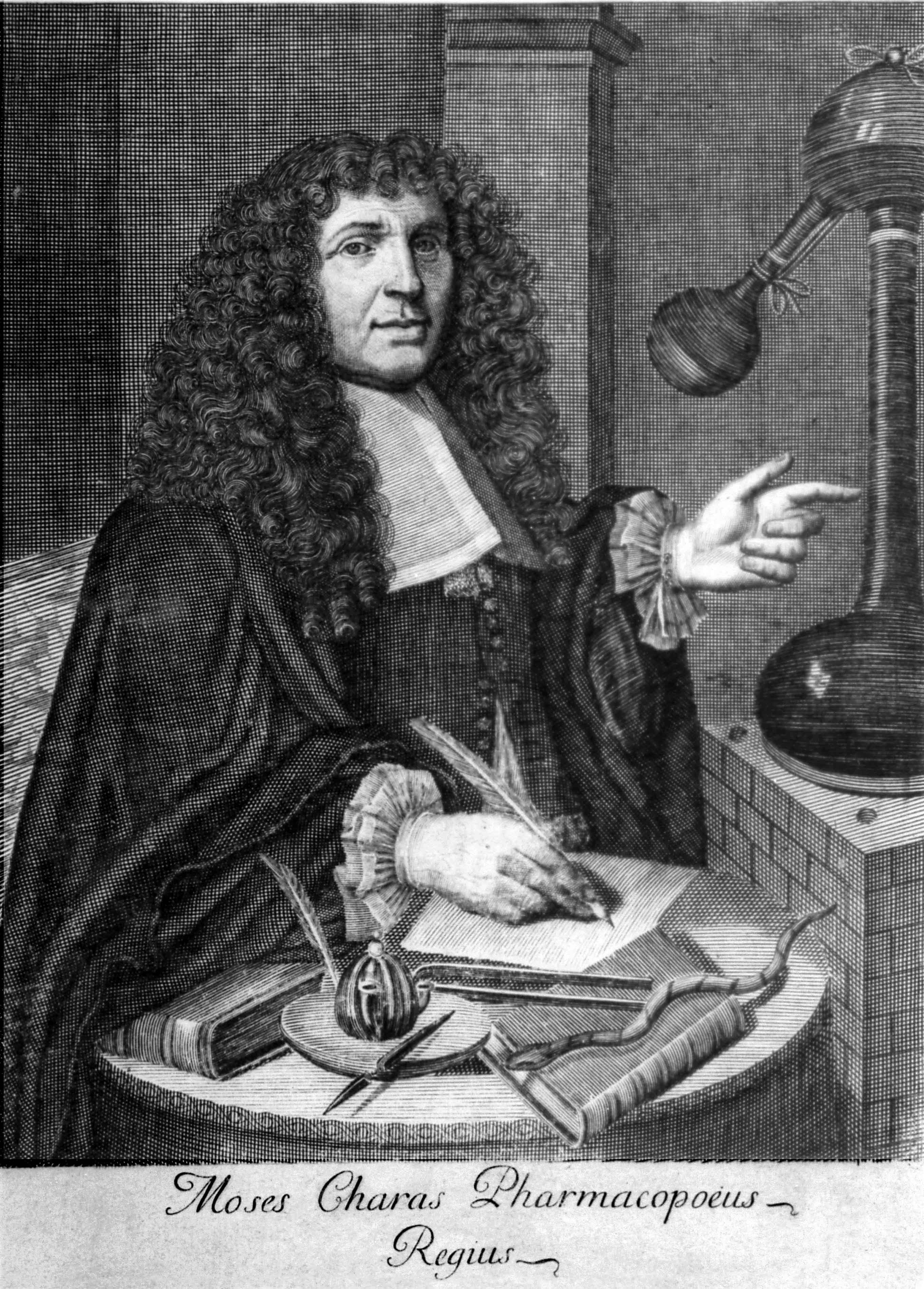
Moyse Charas died 17 January

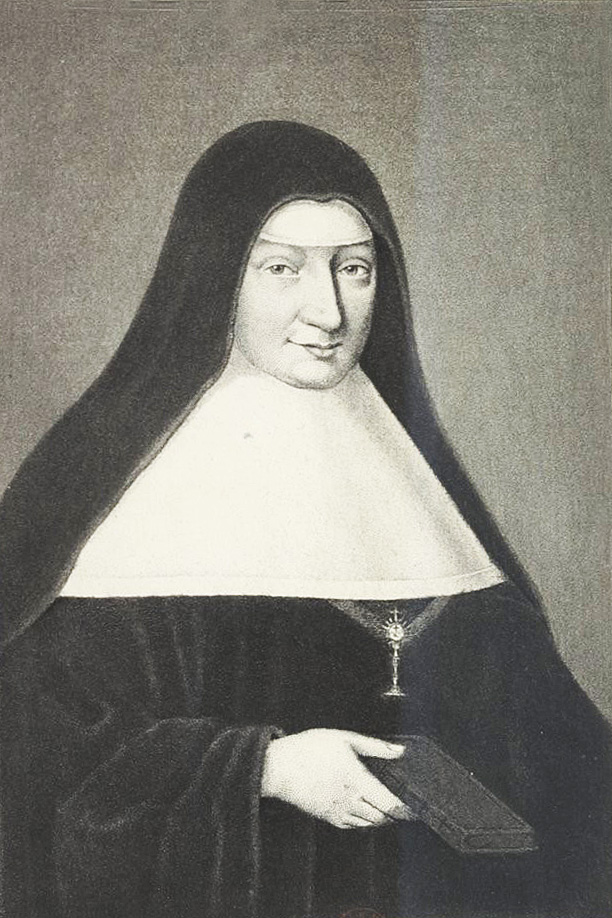
Mechtilde of the Blessed Sacrament died 6 April

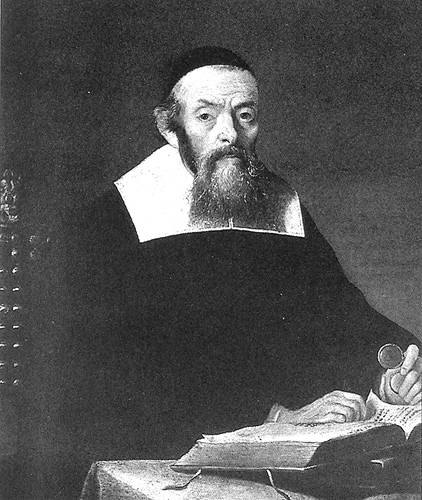
Jacob ben Aaron Sasportas died 15 April

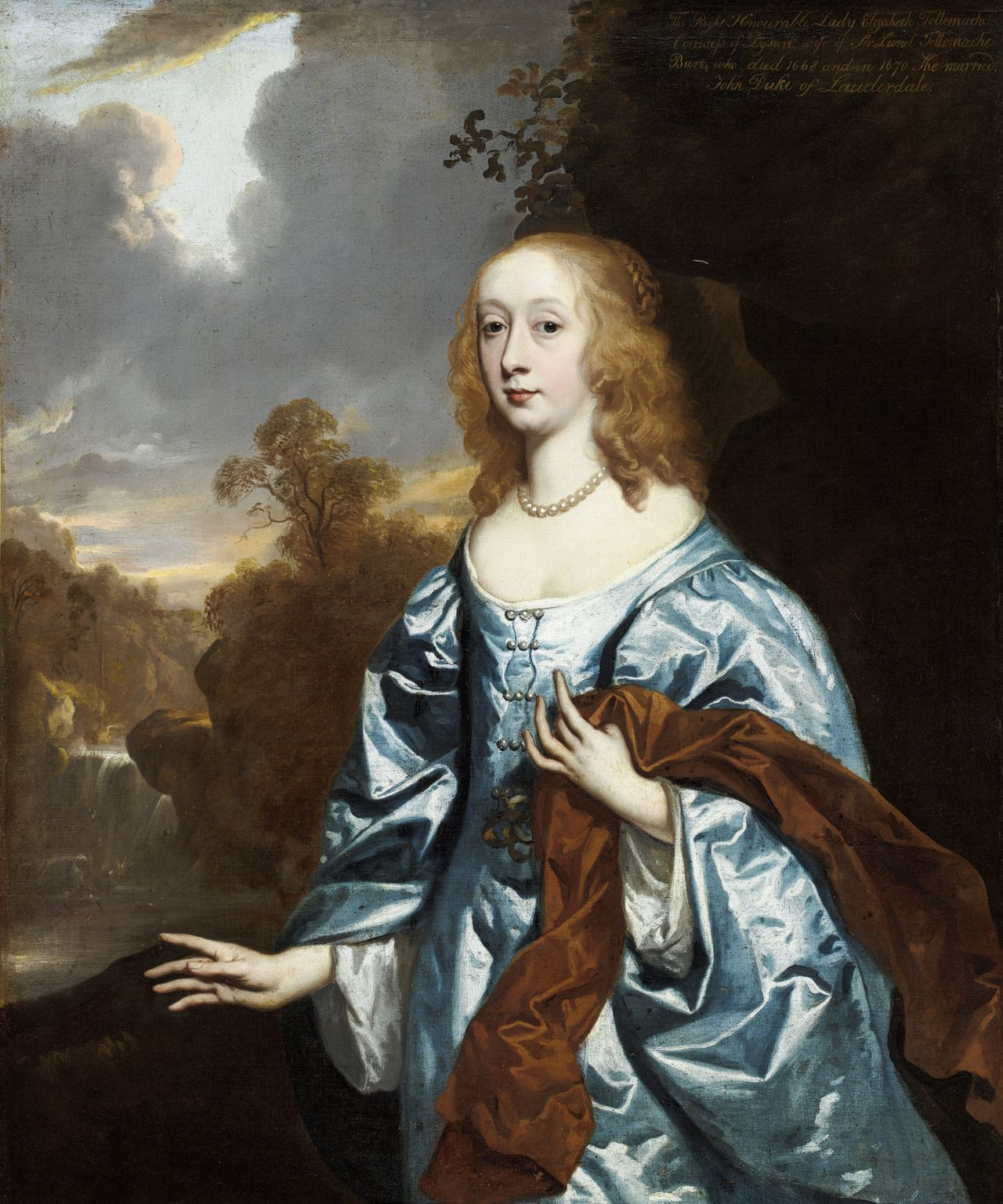
Elizabeth Maitland, Duchess of Lauderdale died 5 June

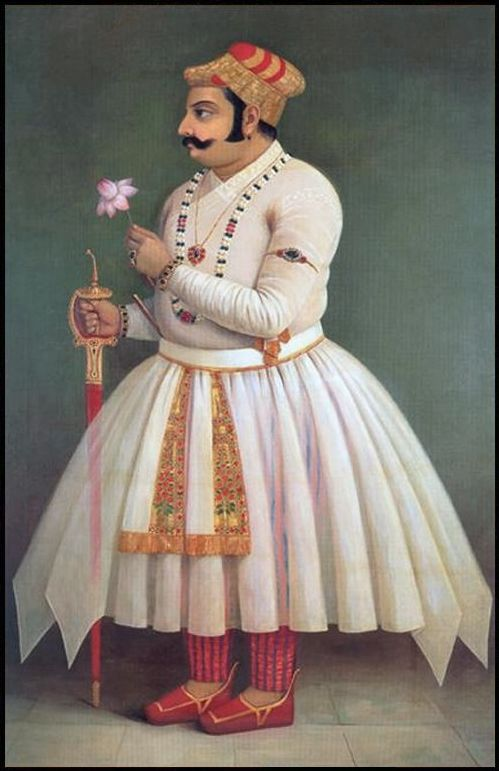
Jai Singh of Mewar died 23 September

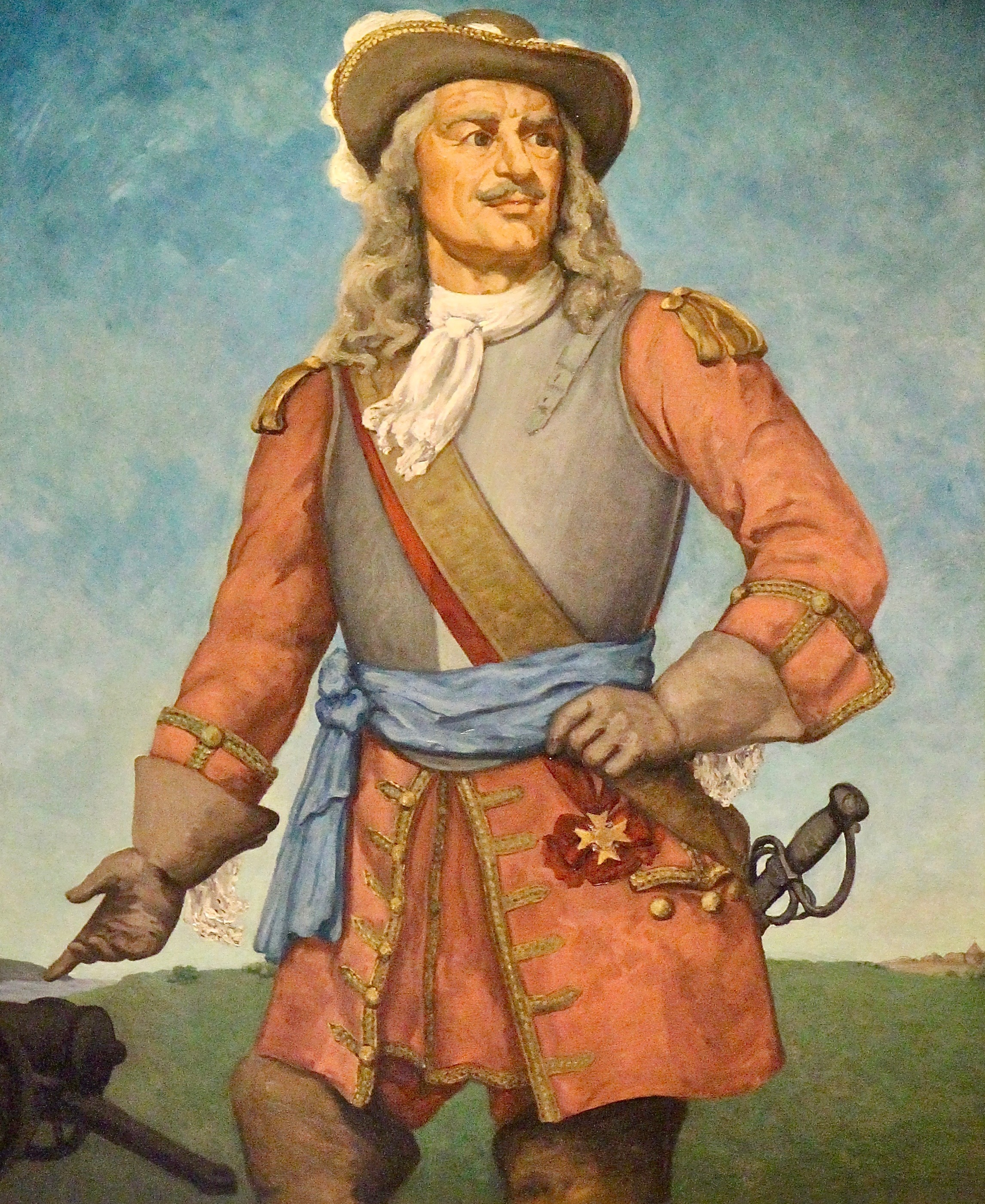
Louis de Buade de Frontenac died 28 November

=== January–March ===
- January 10 – Louis-Sébastien Le Nain de Tillemont, French ecclesiastical historian (b. 1637)
- January 15
  - Girolamo Borghese, Roman Catholic prelate, Bishop of Pienza (1668–1698) (b. 1616)
  - Richard Boyle, 1st Earl of Burlington, Anglo-Irish nobleman, Lord High Treasurer of Ireland, Cavalier (b. 1612)
- January 17 – Moyse Charas, apothecary in France during the reign of Louis XIV (b. 1619)
- January 20 – Giannicolò Conti, Roman Catholic cardinal (b. 1617)
- January 22 – Frederick Casimir Kettler, Duke of Courland and Semigallia (b. 1650)
- January 23 – Ernest Augustus, Elector of Brunswick-Lüneburg (b. 1629)
- February 9 – Francis Bernard, English apothecary (b. 1628)
- February 16 – Sir James Rushout, 1st Baronet, English politician (b. 1644)
- February 21 – Rowland Thomas, English colonist of Springfield, Massachusetts, selectman, stonemason, surveyor, and proprietor (b. 1621)
- March 2 – Jacques Quétif, French Dominican and noted bibliographer (b. 1618)
- March 6 – Philip Sidney, 3rd Earl of Leicester, English politician (b. 1619)
- March 14 – Claes Rålamb, Swedish statesman (b. 1622)
- March 16 – Leonora Christina Ulfeldt, Danish countess (b. 1621)

=== April–June ===
- April 6 – Mechtilde of the Blessed Sacrament, French nun (b. 1614)
- April 9 – Charles d'Albert d'Ailly, French diplomat (b. 1625)
- April 11 – Charles Morton, Cornish nonconformist minister (b. 1627)
- April 15 – Jacob ben Aaron Sasportas, Rabbi, Kabbalist, anti-Shabbethaian (b. 1610)
- April 29 – Charles Cornwallis, 3rd Baron Cornwallis, First Lord of the British Admiralty (b. 1655)
- May 4 – Minye Kyawhtin, king of Toungoo dynasty of Burma (Myanmar) (b. 1651)
- May 15 – Marie Champmeslé, French actress (b. 1642)
- May 19 – Vere Fane, 5th Earl of Westmorland (b. 1678)
- May 24 – William Blundell of Crosby, English Royalist landowner and topographer (b. 1620)
- June 5
  - Elizabeth Maitland, Duchess of Lauderdale, influential British noblewoman (b. 1626)
  - Domenico Minio, Roman Catholic prelate, Bishop of Caorle (1684–1698) (b. 1628)
- June 10 – Gerrit Berckheyde, Dutch Golden Age painter (b. 1638)
- June 11 – Balthasar Bekker, Dutch minister and author of philosophical and theological works (b. 1634)
- June 29 – Paluzzo Paluzzi Altieri degli Albertoni, Italian Catholic Cardinal and Cardinal-Nephew to Pope Clement X (b. 1623)
- June 30 – Charles Cheyne, 1st Viscount Newhaven, English Member of Parliament (b. 1625)

=== July–September ===
- July 11 – Antonio Molinari, Roman Catholic prelate, Bishop of Lettere-Gragnano (1676–1698) (b. 1626)
- July 13 – Charles Somerset, Marquess of Worcester, English nobleman and politician (b. 1660)
- July 18 – Johann Heinrich Heidegger, Swiss theologian (b. 1633)
- July 29 – Bartolomeo Gradenigo, Roman Catholic prelate, Bishop of Brescia (1682–1698) (b. 1636)
- August 14 – Francisco de Aguiar y Seijas, Spanish cleric and bishop (b. 1632)
- August 25 – Fleetwood Sheppard, English poet (b. 1634)
- August 31 – Miguel Jerónimo de Molina, Spanish prelate and bishop (b. 1638)
- September 23 – Jai Singh of Mewar, Maharana of Mewar from 1680 to 1698 (b. 1653)

=== October–December ===
- October 11 – William Molyneux, Irish philosopher and writer (b. 1656)
- October 23 – David Klöcker Ehrenstrahl, German artist (b. 1628)
- October 24 – Daniel de Rémy de Courcelle, Canadian politician (b. 1626)
- November 4 – Rasmus Bartholin, Danish physician and grammarian (b. 1625)
- November 10 – John George II, Duke of Saxe-Eisenach (b. 1665)
- November 13 – Johann, Count of Leiningen-Dagsburg-Falkenburg, German nobleman (b. 1662)
- November 20 – Giovanni Battista De Pace, Roman Catholic prelate, Bishop of Capaccio (1684–1698) (b. 1627)
- November 23 – César-Pierre Richelet, French grammarian and lexicographer (b. 1626)
- November 28 – Louis de Buade de Frontenac, Governor of New France (b. 1622)
- December 1 – Ferdinand Joseph, Prince of Dietrichstein, German prince (b. 1636)
- December 7 – Andrea Guarneri, Italian luthier (b. 1626)
- December 9 – José González Blázquez, Roman Catholic prelate, Bishop of Plasencia (1695–1698) (b. 1630)
- December 16 – Simone Pignoni, Italian painter (b. 1611)
- December 26 – Wolfgang Julius, Count of Hohenlohe-Neuenstein, German field marshal and the last count of Hohenlohe-Neuenstein (b. 1622)
- date unknown
  - Nicholas Barbon, English economist (b. c. 1640)
  - Franciscus Mercurius van Helmont, Flemish alchemist (b. 1614)
- in fiction – Mircalla Karnstein, Countess of Karnstein (b. 1680)

1699

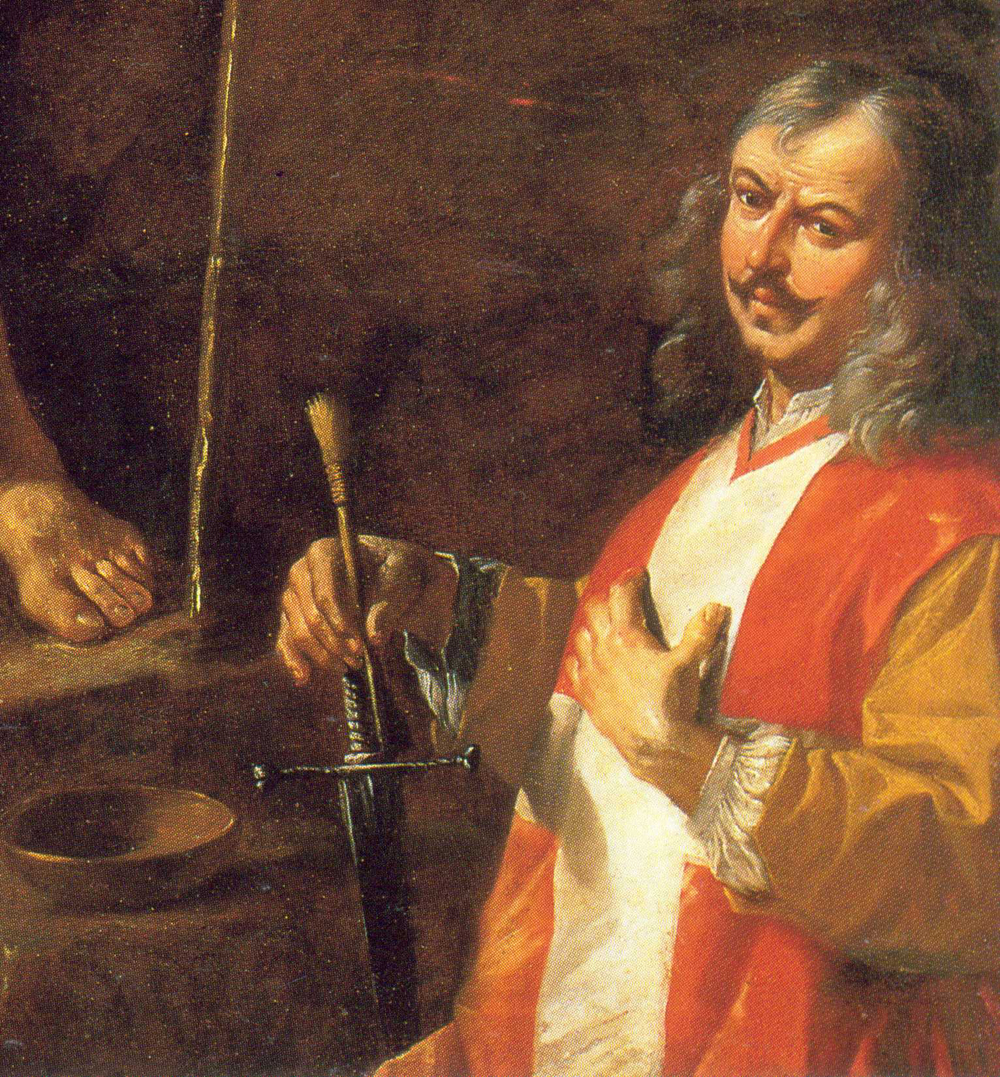
Mattia Preti died 3 January

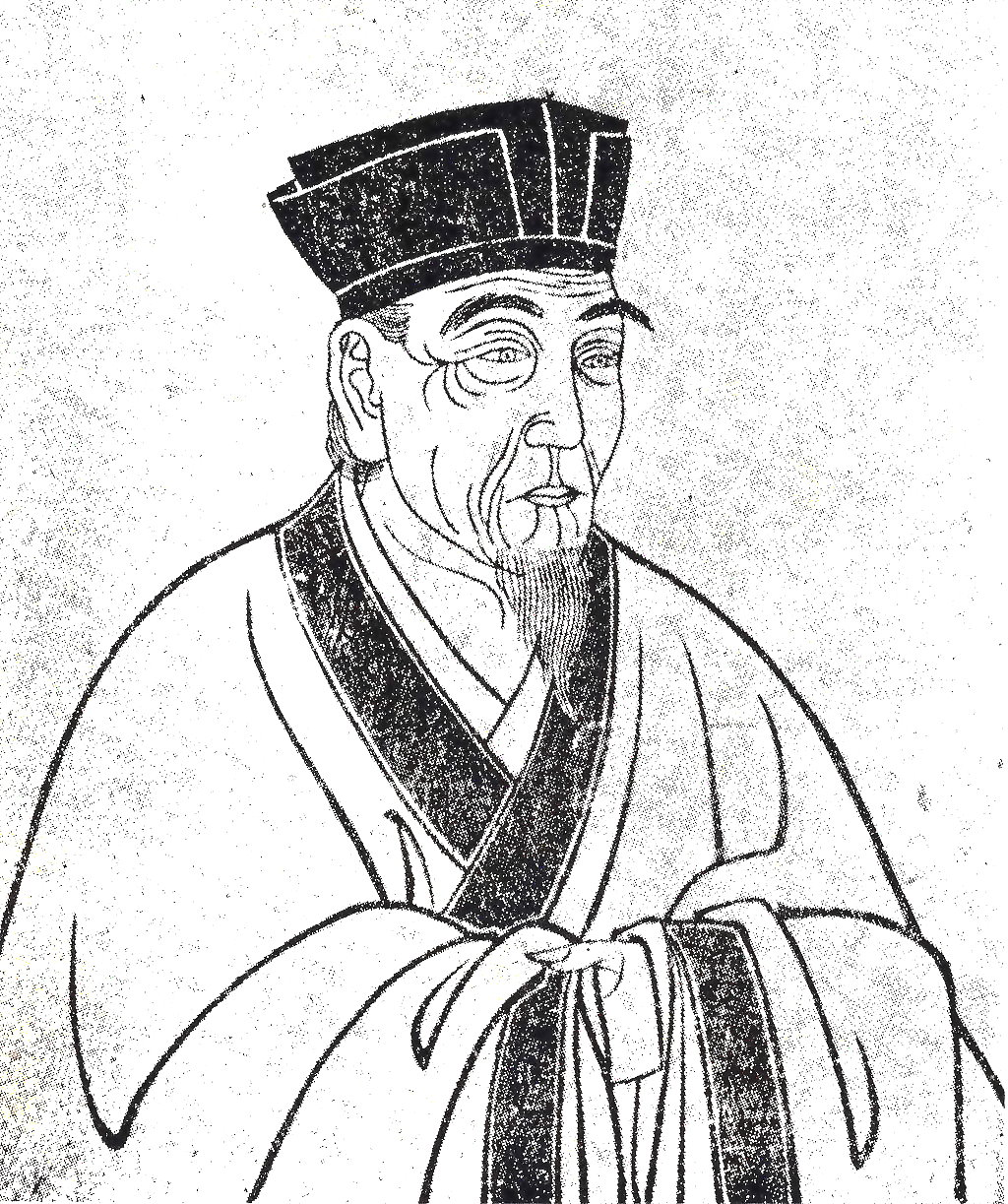
Kinoshita Jun'an died 23 January

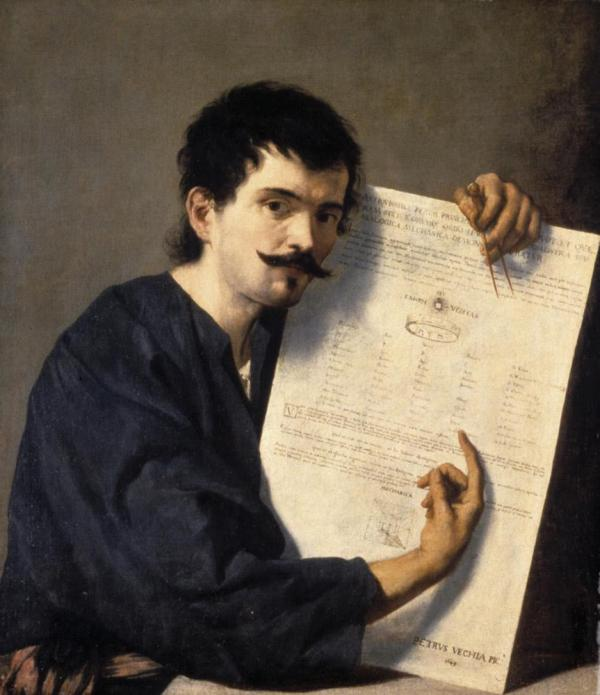
Erhard Weigel died 20 March

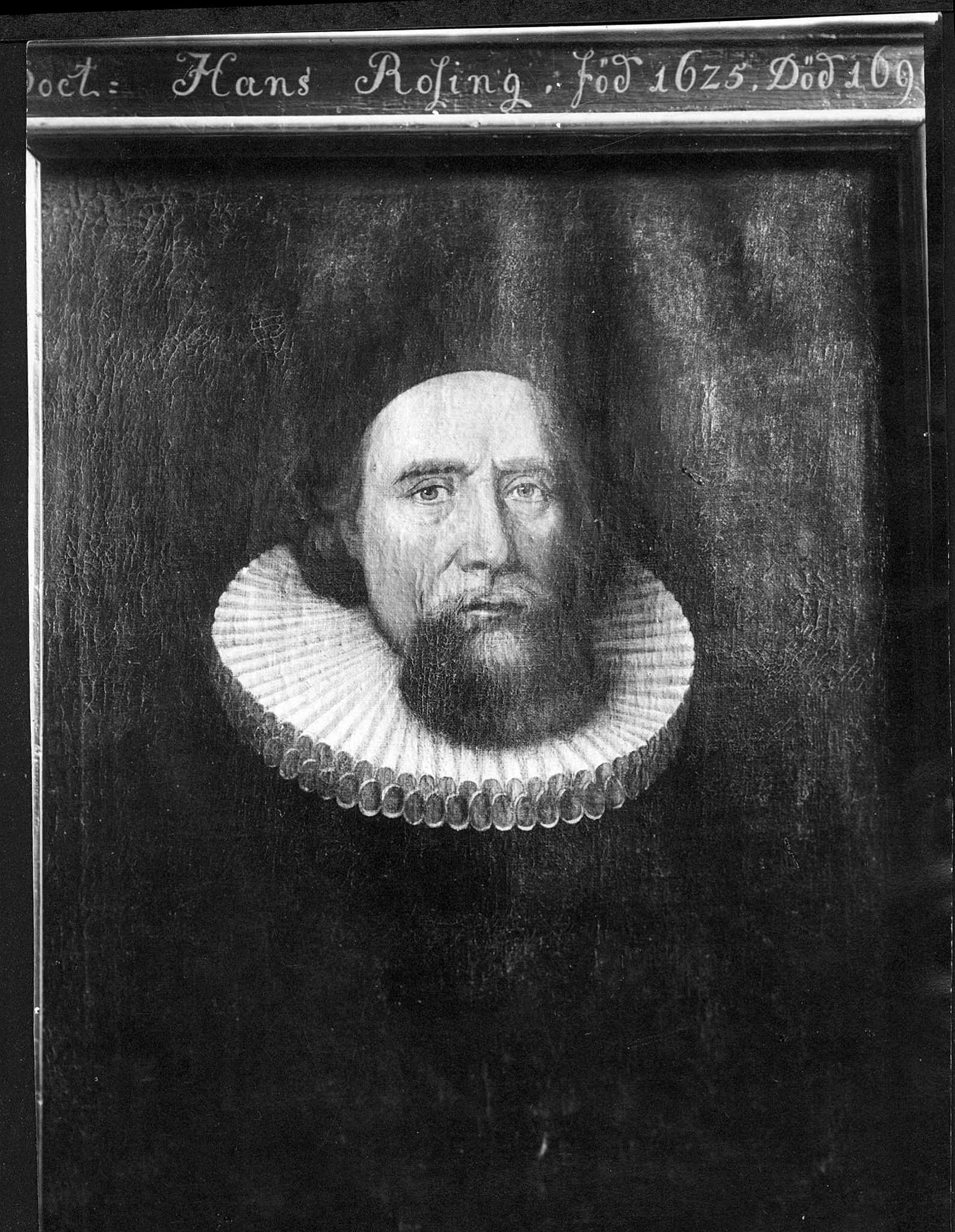
Hans Rosing died 13 April

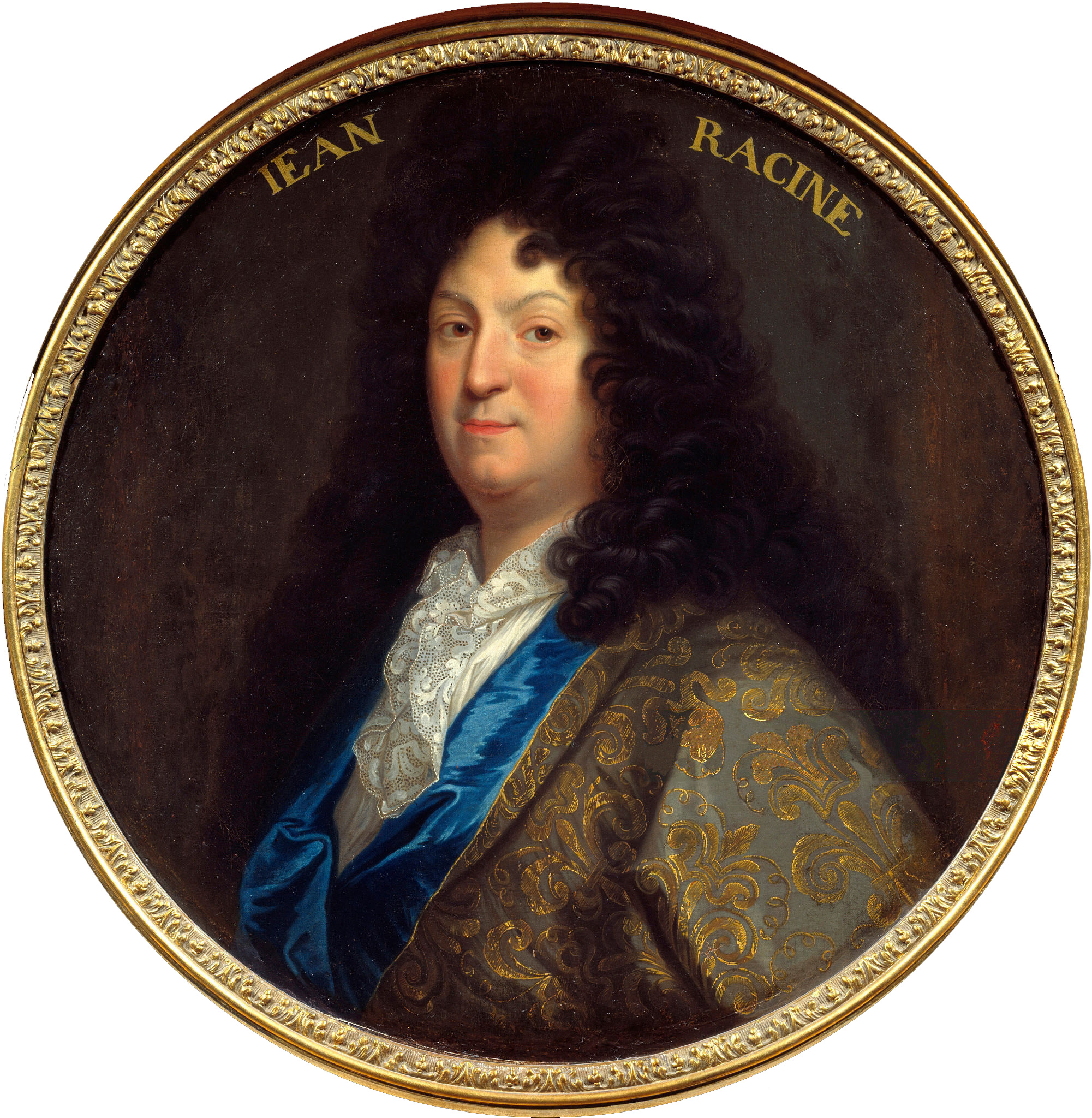
Jean Racine died 21 April

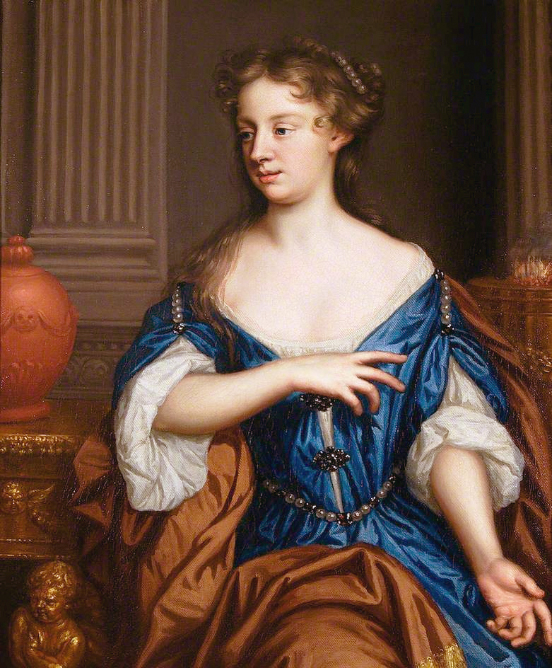
Mary Beale died 8 October

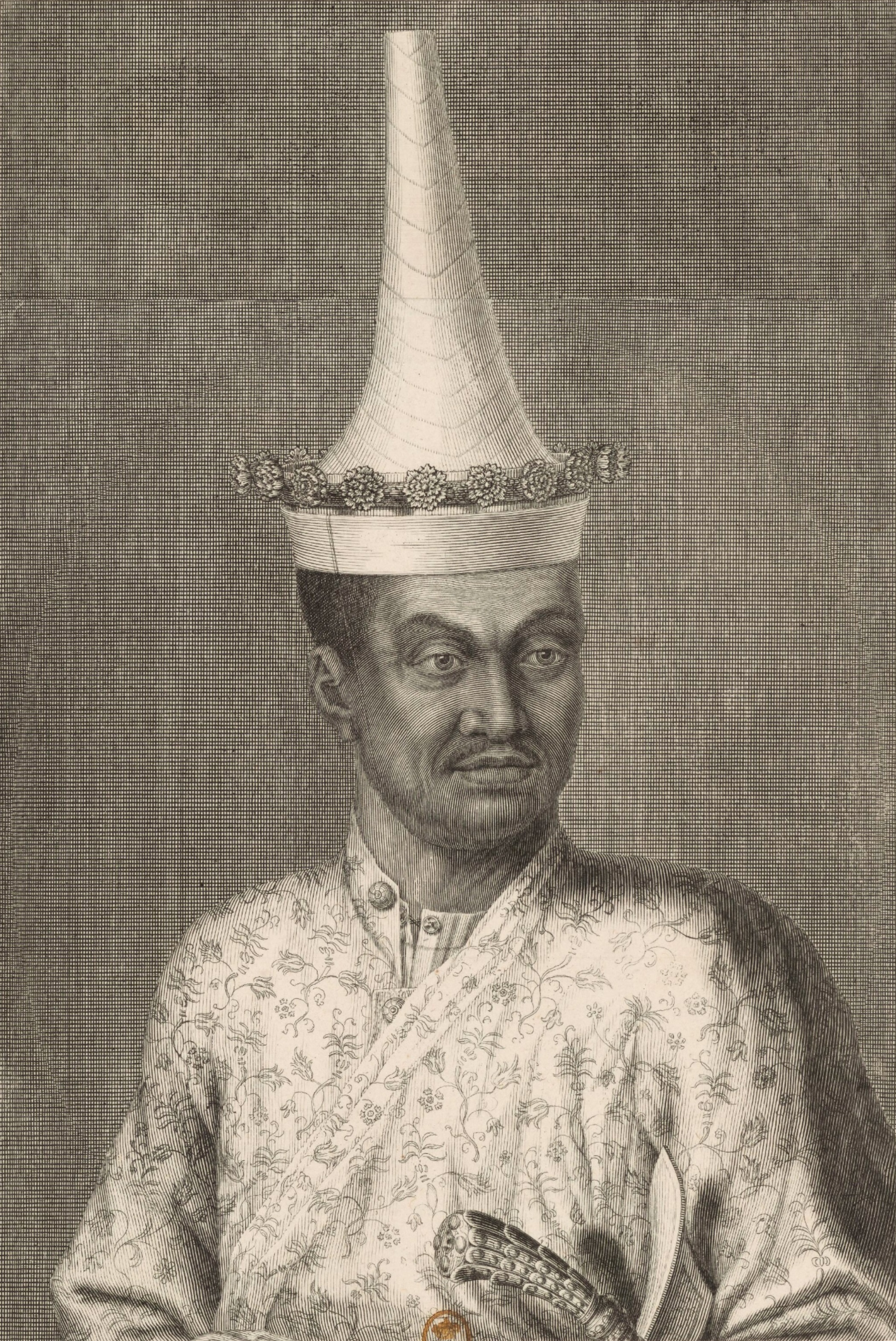
Kosa Pan died 15 November

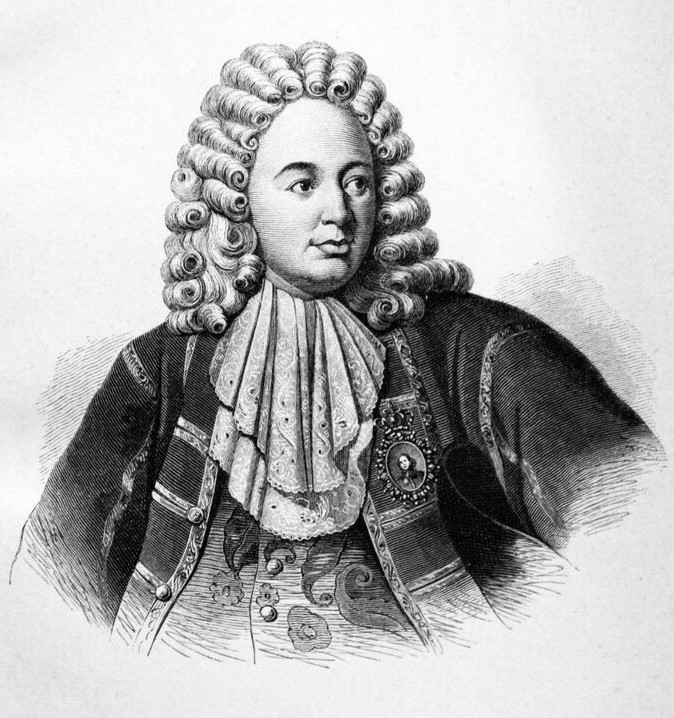
Patrick Gordon died 29 November

=== January–March ===
- January 3 – Mattia Preti, Italian Baroque artist who worked in Italy and Malta (b. 1613)
- January 14 – Federico Caccia, Cardinal Archbishop of Milan (b. 1635)
- January 21 – Obadiah Walker, English writer (b. 1616)
- January 23 – Kinoshita Jun'an, Japanese philosopher and Confucian scholar (b. 1621)
- January 27 – Sir William Temple, 1st Baronet, English statesman and essayist (b. 1628)
- February 1
  - Thomas Chicheley, English politician (b. 1614)
  - Manuel Fernández de Santa Cruz, Spanish religious writer, Catholic prelate and bishop (b. 1637)
  - Countess Charlotte Johanna of Waldeck-Wildungen, daughter of Count Josias II (b. 1664)
- February 6 – Joseph Ferdinand of Bavaria, son of Maximilian II Emanuel (b. 1692)
- February 18 – Giovanni Giacomo Cavallerini, Roman Catholic cardinal (b. 1639)
- February 20 – Jean-Baptiste Monnoyer, Franco-Flemish painter who specialised in flower pieces (b. 1636)
- February 25 – Lambert Darchis, arts patron from Liège (b. 1625)
- March 12
  - Peder Griffenfeld, Danish statesman (b. 1635)
  - Matsudaira Tsunamasa (b. 1661)
- March 17 – Serafina of God, founder of seven Carmelite monasteries of nuns in southern Italy (b. 1621)
- March 20
  - Charles Montecatini, Roman Catholic prelate who served as Titular Archbishop of Chalcedon (1690–1699) (b. 1615)
  - Erhard Weigel, German mathematician, astronomer and philosopher (b. 1625)
- March 22 – William Chaloner (b. 1650)
- March 27 – Edward Stillingfleet, British theologian and scholar (b. 1635)

=== April–June ===
- April 1 – Peter Pett, English lawyer and author (b. 1630)
- April 7 – Simon Ford, English divine (b. 1619)
- April 13 – Hans Rosing, Norwegian clergyman (b. 1625)
- April 19 – Jacques-Nompar II de Caumont, duc de La Force, French nobleman and peer (b. 1632)
- April 21 – Jean Racine, French classic dramatist (b. 1639)
- April 22
  - Hans Erasmus Aßmann, Freiherr von Abschatz, German statesman and poet (b. 1646)
  - François-Marie Renaud d'Avène des Meloizes (b. 1655)
- May 12 – Lucas Achtschellinck, Flemish painter (b. 1626)
- May 15 – Sir Edward Petre, 3rd Baronet, English Jesuit, privy councillor (b. 1631)
- May 16 – Christine Charlotte of Württemberg, princess consort of East Frisia by marriage to George Christian (b. 1645)
- May 22 – James Bertie, 1st Earl of Abingdon, English nobleman (b. 1653)
- May 25 – Bussy Mansell, Welsh Member of the English Parliament (b. 1623)
- June 1 – George II, Duke of Württemberg-Montbéliard, (1662–1699) (b. 1626)
- June 2 – Henry Frederick, Count of Hohenlohe-Langenburg, youngest child of Count Philip Ernest (b. 1625)
- June 13 – Juan Tomás de Rocaberti, Catalan theologian (b. 1627)
- June 16 – Constantin Marselis, Danish baron (b. 1647)
- June 22
  - Josiah Child, English Governor of the East India Company (b. 1630)
  - Fernando de Meneses, 2nd Count of Ericeira, Portuguese nobleman and military man (b. 1614)

=== July–September ===
- July 1
  - Lodewijck Huygens, Dutch diplomat (b. 1631)
  - Tokugawa Tsunanari, Japanese daimyō (b. 1652)
- July 2 – Hortense Mancini, favourite Italian niece of Cardinal Mazarin (b. 1646)
- July 3 – Johann Just Winckelmann, German writer and historian (b. 1620)
- July 10 – Pier Martire Armani, Italian painter (b. 1613)
- July 19 – Giovanni Delfino, cardinal (b. 1617)
- August 4 – Maria Sophia of Neuburg, Queen consort of Portugal (b. 1666)
- August 6 – Albert V, Duke of Saxe-Coburg, duke of Saxe-Coburg (b. 1648)
- August 11 – Friedrich von Canitz, German poet and diplomat (b. 1654)
- August 13 – Marco d'Aviano, Italian Capuchin friar (b. 1631)
- August 19 – José Saenz d'Aguirre, Spanish Catholic cardinal (b. 1630)
- August 24 – Lucrezia Barberini, Italian noblewoman and (b. 1628)
- August 25 – Christian V of Denmark, King of Denmark and Norway (b. 1646)
- August 28 – Joseph Barret, English businessman and theological writer (b. 1665)
- September 8 – Gottfried Wilhelm Sacer, German jurist (b. 1635)
- September 13 – James Fraser of Brea, Covenanter (b. 1639)
- September 17 – Augustus, Duke of Schleswig-Holstein-Sonderburg-Plön-Norburg (b. 1635)
- September 26 – Simon Arnauld de Pomponne, French diplomat and minister (b. 1618)

=== October–December ===
- October 3 – Edward Ayscough, English politician (b. 1650)
- October 4 – George Evelyn, English politician (b. 1617)
- October 8 – Mary Beale, English portrait painter (b. 1633)
- November 2 – Anthony Ashley-Cooper, 2nd Earl of Shaftesbury, English politician (b. 1652)
- November 15 – Kosa Pan, Siamese diplomat and minister who led the second Siamese embassy to France sent by King Narai in 1686 (b. 1633)
- November 23 – Joseph Beaumont, British academic and poet (b. 1616)
- November 28 – Mary Allerton, Dutch settler of Plymouth Colony in what is now Massachusetts (b. 1616)
- November 29 – Patrick Gordon, general and rear admiral in Russia (b. 1635)
- December 7 – Sigmund von Erlach, Swiss politician (b. 1614)
- December 17 – John Francis Desideratus, Prince of Nassau-Siegen, (1652–1699) (b. 1627)
- December 22 – Michelangelo Mattei, Roman Catholic prelate, Titular Patriarch of Antioch, Titular Archbishop of Hadrianopolis in Haemimonto (b. 1628)
- December 31 – Giulio Dalla Rosa, Roman Catholic prelate who served as Bishop of Borgo San Donnino (1698–1699) (b. 1642)

=== Date unknown ===
- Henry Every, English pirate (b. 1659)
