= C. danae =

C. danae may refer to:

- Callinectes danae, a crab species
- Chauliodus danae, a fish species
- Cirrobrachium danae, a squid species
- Colotis danae, a butterfly species

== See also ==
- Danae (disambiguation)
