= Time Defeated by Love, Beauty and Hope =

Painting by Simon Vouet

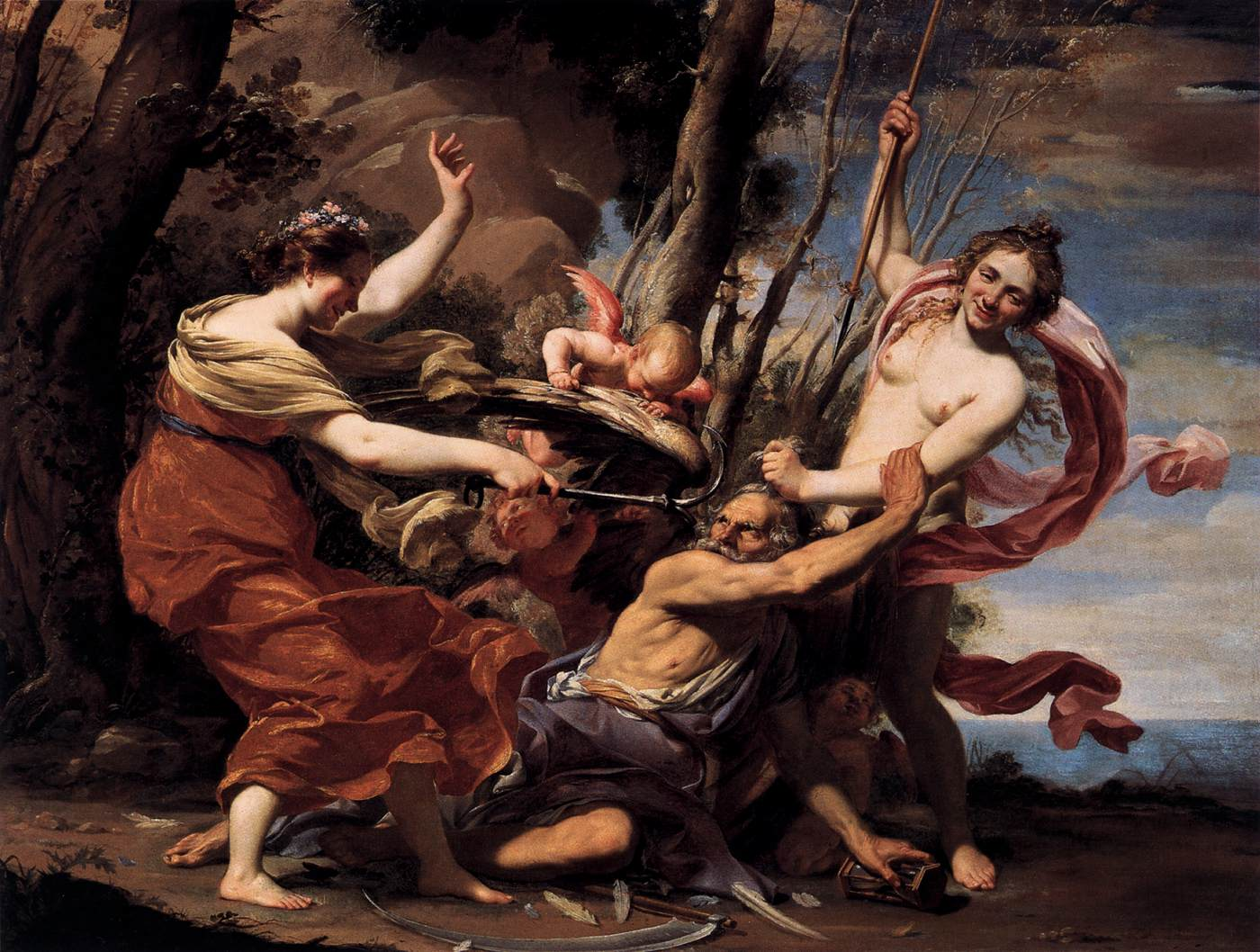
- Artist: Simon Vouet
- Year: 1627
- Medium: Oil on canvas
- Dimensions: 107 cm × 142 cm (42 in × 56 in)
- Location: Museo del Prado; Madrid

Time Defeated by Love, Beauty and Hope or Allegory of Time and Beauty is a 1627 oil-on-canvas painting by the French artist Simon Vouet. It is held in the Museo del Prado, in Madrid, which bought it in London in 1954.

== Description ==
The titan Cronus is personified as the inexorable Time that devours everything, only occasionally stopped or defeated by Love, Beauty and Hope. The allegory is shown in a somewhat humorous and jovial way.

Time, with the scythe of death and an hourglass, is brought down by Beauty and Hope, helped by some putti, who attack the old man on the ground, in a humorous way, biting and plucking his wings. A wreath of flowers identifies Hope, wearing a brown dress, who uses an anchor, while a naked and smiling Beauty, for whom Vouet is believed to have used his wife, Virginia Vezzi, as a model, helds a spear in his direction, and is also pulling out some of his hair. The scene has for background a rock and some trees while to the right extends a landscape with the sea visible in the distance.
