= S. danae =

S. danae may refer to:

- Scinax danae, a frog species
- Sympetrum danae, the black darter, a butterfly species

== See also ==
- Danae (disambiguation)
