= T. danae =

T. danae may refer to:

- Taningia danae, a squid species
- Tanysiptera danae, a kingfisher species

== See also ==
- Danae (disambiguation)
