= Perseus Rescuing Andromeda (Cesari) =

Painting on stone by Giuseppe Cesari

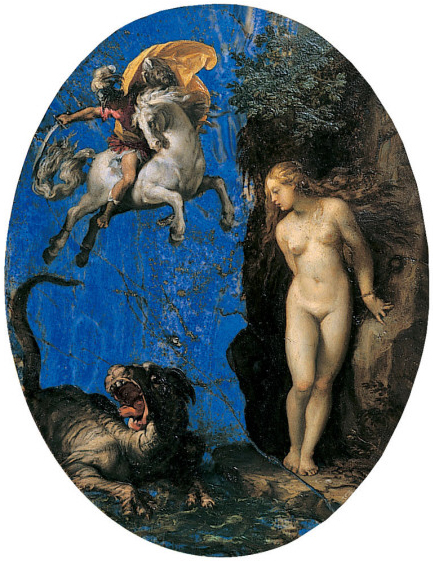
- Artist: Giuseppe Cesari
- Year: 1593–94
- Medium: Oil on lapis lazuli
- Dimensions: 20.2 cm × 15.6 cm (8.0 in × 6.1 in)
- Location: Saint Louis Art Museum, St. Louis

Perseus Rescuing Andromeda is the title of two paintings by the Italian artist Giuseppe Cesari, also known as Cavaliere d'Arpino. Cesari was a prominent late Renaissance and early Baroque painter, known for his work in Rome during the late 16th and early 17th centuries.

The paintings were created on stone, including one example on lapis lazuli and another on limestone. These works are notable examples of a trend among Renaissance artists to work with stone supports, often incorporating the color and patterns of the stone into the composition.

== Description ==
The two versions of the painting have similar compositions. Perseus flies on horseback, ready to confront the monster beneath him. The sea monster, its scaled hide reflecting the iridescent hues of the ocean depths, rears up menacingly, its jaws gaping wide, poised to consume its innocent victim, Andromeda, the Ethiopian princess. She stands bound and helpless as she gazes at the threat beneath her.

== Materials ==
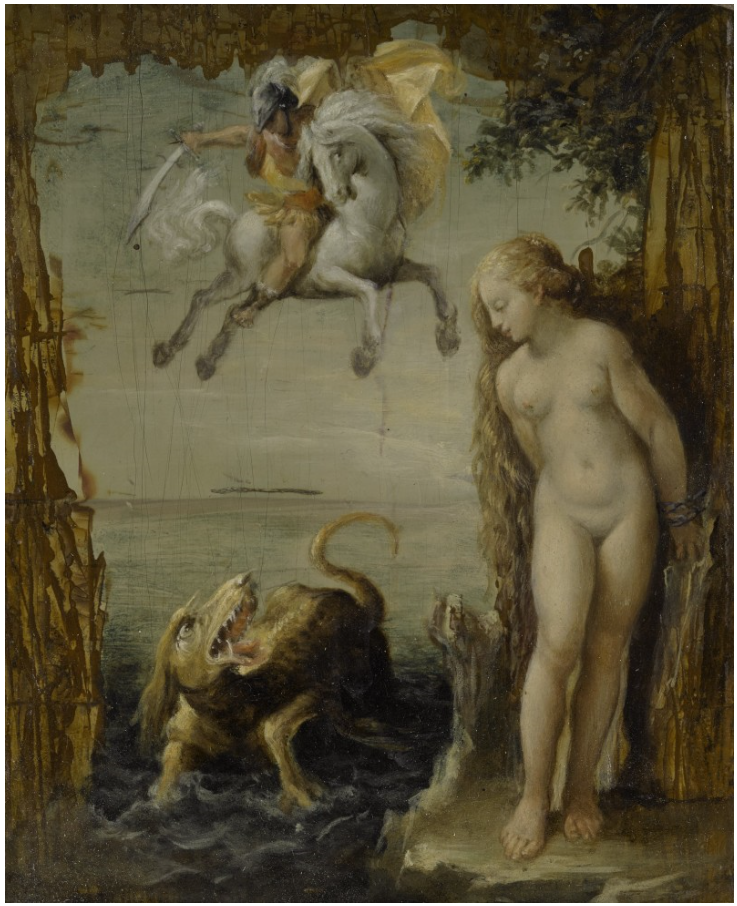
Giuseppe Cesarai, Perseus Rescuing Andromeda (on limestone)

Cesari exploits the properties of stone to give each painting distinctive qualities. When working on lapis lazuli, he uses the stone's rich blue hue to represent the vast expanse of sky, which serves as the backdrop for the heroic rescue. In his painting on limestone, Cesari capitalizes on the stone's natural green-gray tones to fashion the rugged crags that loom behind Andromeda, lending a sense of formidable grandeur to the landscape. In other works, Cesari explored different materials such as slate and wood, where each medium contributes distinct nuances to the final composition.
