= Danaë (disambiguation) =

Danaë was the mother of Perseus in Greek mythology.

Danaë or Danae may also refer to:

== Paintings ==
- Danaë (Blanchard), two paintings attributed to Jacques Blanchard
- Danaë (Correggio) (c. 1531)
- Danae (Artemisia Gentileschi) (c. 1612)
- Danaë (Orazio Gentileschi) (c. 1623)
- Danaë (Klimt) (1907)
- Danaë (Rembrandt) (1636)
- Danaë (Tintoretto) (1570)
- Danaë (Titian paintings), a series of at least five paintings

== Astronomy ==
- 61 Danaë, an asteroid
- a name proposed in 1973 for Carme, a satellite of Jupiter

== Biology ==
- Danae (plant), a genus of plants
- Danae (beetle), a genus of beetles

== Ships ==
- Danae-class cruiser, a class of Royal Navy light cruisers
- HMS Danae, multiple ships
- French frigate Danaé (1807)

== People ==
- DaNae Couch, beauty pageant winner
- Danae Kara (born 1953), Greek classical concert pianist and educator
- Danae Sweetapple (born 1967), Australian Paralympic swimmer

== Other uses ==
- Cyclone Danae, in January 1975
- Die Liebe der Danae, an opera by Richard Strauss
- Danae, a play by Livius Andronicus
- Danae Pyle, a character in the comic strip Non Sequitur
- Mount Danae, a mountain in New Zealand

== See also ==
- Danaus
- Danaea
- Dana (disambiguation)
