= Bernardino Cesari =

Italian painter (1571–1622)

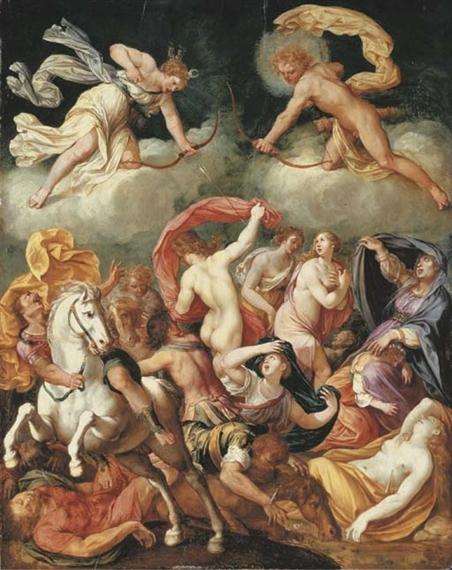
The Destruction of Niobe's Children

Bernardino Cesari (1571 – 30 June 1622) was an Italian painter of the late-Mannerist and early Baroque period, active mainly in Rome and Naples, where he assisted his brother Giuseppe Cesari (Cavaliere d'Arpino).

On 9 November 1592, he was sentenced to death, for consorting with bandits, and fled to Naples. On 13 May 1593, he was pardoned and returned to Rome. In 1616, he travelled with Giuseppe to Naples to assist in painting in the Certosa di San Martino, then to Piedimonte di Alife to paint a large Last Judgement in the chapel of the fathers "predicatori". He travelled to Monte Cassino where he laboured with Giuseppe in the frescoes for the refectory and the stanza of San Benedict, then to Rome where he painted an oil canvas of Noli me tangere, a fresco of Constantine the Great, a St. Peter, and three oil paintings for the church Santi Cosma e Damiano .

== Works ==
- Destruction of Niobe's Children
- Hannibal's Defeat by Scipio Africanus
- Noli me tangere
- Persephone and Andromeda
- St. Peter, Santi Cosma e Damiano
- St. Cecilia
- Diana and Acteon
- Sts. Stephen and Agatha
- A fresco of Constantine the Great, right transept, Basilica of San Giovanni Laterano
- Paintings at Certosa di San Martino, Naples

== Bibliography ==
His biography is collected in Giovanni Baglione's Vite. p. 139.

- Hobbes, James R. (1849). Picture collector's manual adapted to the professional man, and the amateur. London: T&W Boone. p. 49.
- Minieri-Riccio, Camillo (1844). Memorie storiche degli scrittori nati nel regno di Napoli. Naples: Tipografia dell'Aquila di V. Puzziello. p. 95.
