= Geronima Parasole =

Italian artist, 1569–1622

Geronima Parasole (1569–1622) was an Italian wood block cutter and print maker also known as Girolama Parasoli, Hieronima Parasole, and Hieronima Cagnaccia Parasole. She was the sister-in-law of Isabella Parasole and wife of wood engraver Leonardo Parasole.

== Works ==
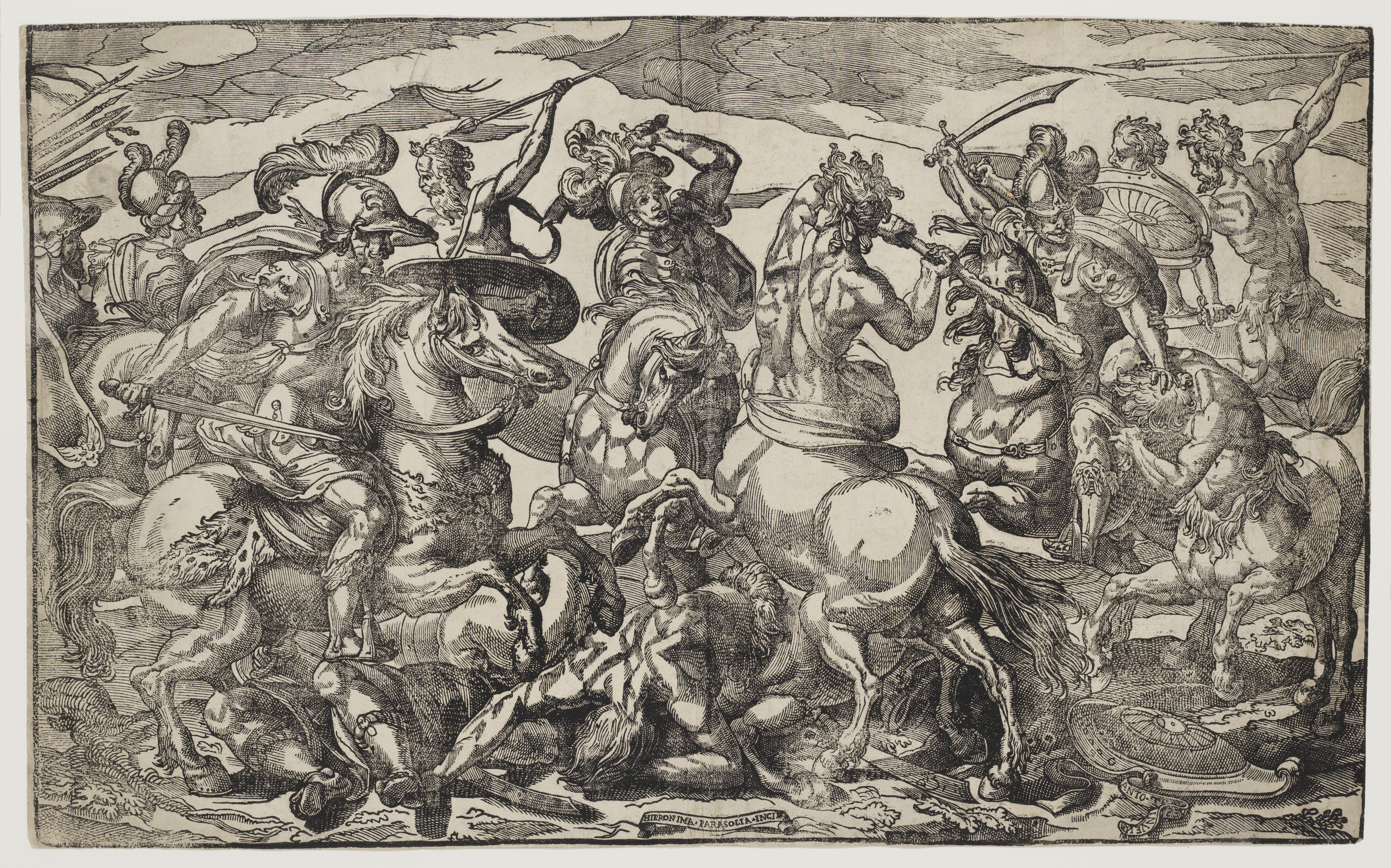
Geronima Parasole after Antonio Tempesta, Battle of Lapiths and Centaurs, n.d. (Print: Woodcut, Sheet: 16 3/4 * 27 3/16 in. (42.6 * 69 cm)

Geronima Cagnaccia Parasole after Antonio Tempesta, Battle of Lapiths and Centaurs, c. 1600. Woodcut. 42 by 68 cm. Samuel Putnam Avery Collection, Print Collection, Miriam and Ira D. Wallach Division of Art, Prints and Photographs, The New York Public Library, Astor, Lenox and Tildern Foundations. Grolier 356, Object number 112860.
