= Bernardino Parasole =

Italian painter

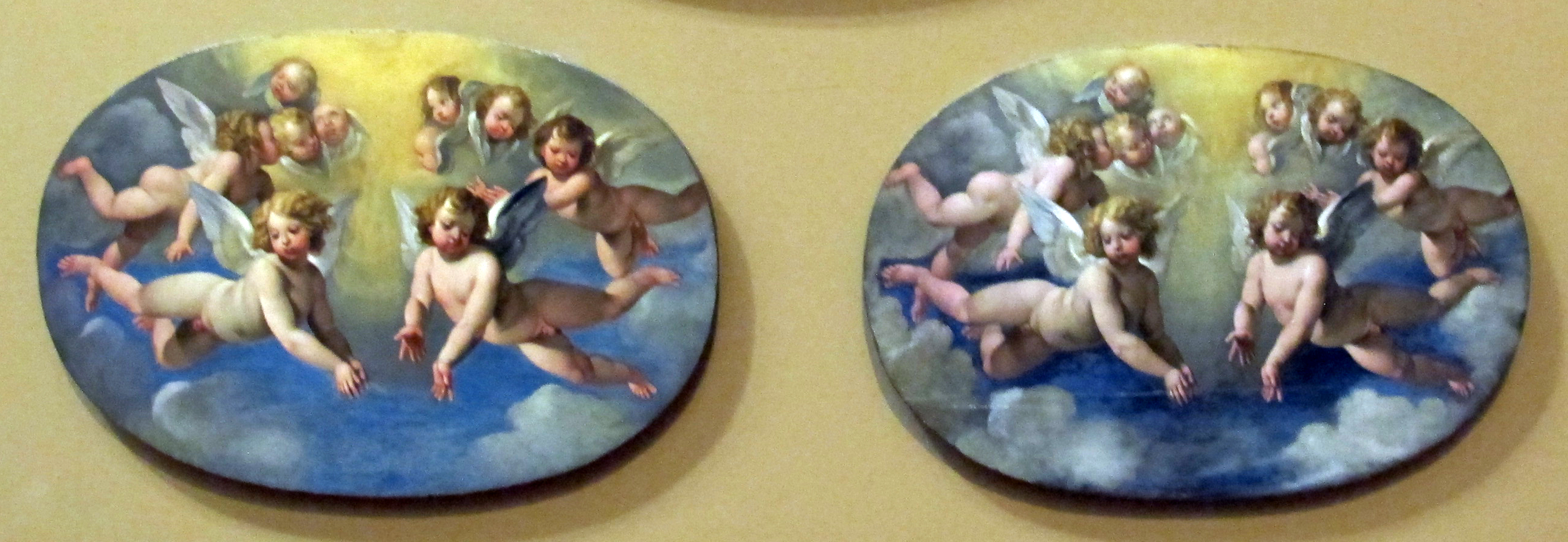
Gloria d'angeli (1623), Capodimonte

Bernardino Parasole (c. 17th century) was an Italian painter of the Baroque period.

He was born to the painters Isabella and Leonardo Parasole, but then apprenticed with Giuseppe Cesari. Bernardino died young.
