= Leonardo Parasole =

Italian engraver

- Born: c. 1570–1612; Rome, Italy
- Spouse: Geronima Parasole
- Children: Bernardino Parasole

Leonardo Parasole (c. 1570–1612) was an Italian engraver on wood of the late-Mannerist and early-Baroque periods.

He was born and remained in Rome throughout his life. Parasole designed cuts for the Herbal book written by Castore Durante, physician to Pope Sixtus V. He also engraved the wood-cuts to a Testamentum novnm, arabice et latine' and several prints from the designs of Antonio Tempesta, including an Annunciation.

== Personal life ==
Parasole married the engraver Geronima Cagnaccia Parasole. Their son, Bernardino Parasole, was also an engraver and painter.
