= Castore Durante =

Italian physician, botanist, and poet

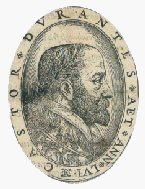
Castore Durante

Castore Durante, also called Castor Durante da Gualdo (Gualdo Tadino, 1529 – Viterbo, 1590) was a physician, botanist and poet of the Italian Renaissance. His father was the jurist Giovan Diletto Durante. He had five siblings, including a brother named Pollùce (Pollux).

He graduated in medicine at Perugia in 1567 and practiced as a doctor in Gualdo Tadino. He later taught at the "Archiginnasio della Sapienza" (now called the Sapienza University of Rome) and, on the recommendation of Cardinal Girolamo Rusticucci, was appointed chief physician at the court of Pope Sixtus V.

He died at Viterbo in 1590 and was buried in the church of the Franciscan monastery.

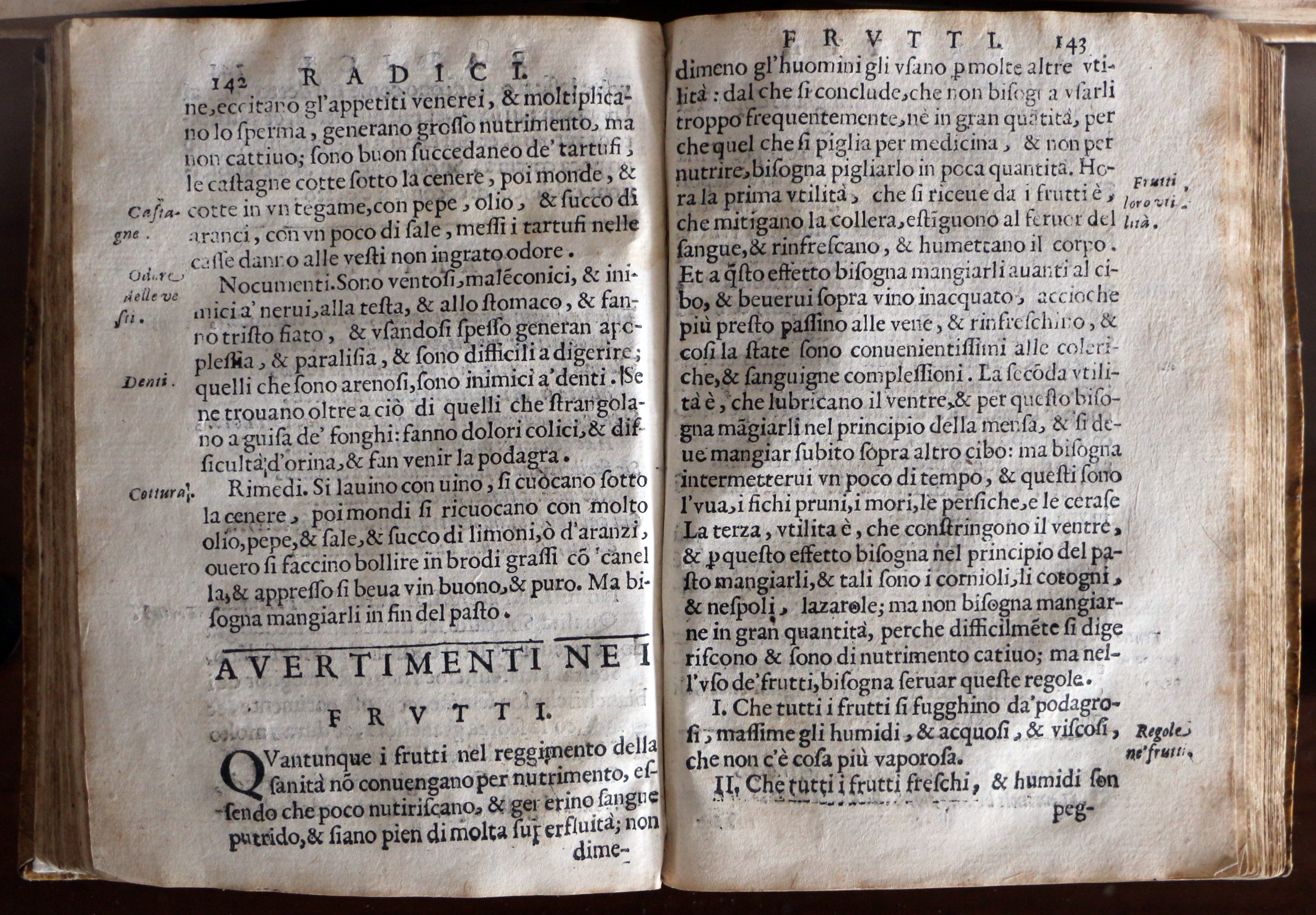
Castore Durante, Il tesoro della sanità, Venezia 1629

== Major works ==
- Herbario Nuovo, published in 1585, is a description of medicinal plants from Europe and the Indies (East and West). The first editions were illustrated by Leonardo Parasole da Norcia (fl.1570), while the third edition contains woodcuts by his wife, the engraver Isabella Parasole. Each species includes discussions of its habitat and medicinal uses, in both Italian and Latin. It went through eleven editions in Italian, German and Spanish. Reprints appeared occasionally for over 130 years. (Digital edition from 1602 by the University and State Library Düsseldorf)
- Il Tesoro della Sanità, published in 1586, is a collection of folk-medicine remedies for the family, with practical rules for hygiene and dietary suggestions. In 1686 it was translated into English by John Chamberlayne.
