= Virginia Vezzi =

Italian artist (1601–1638)

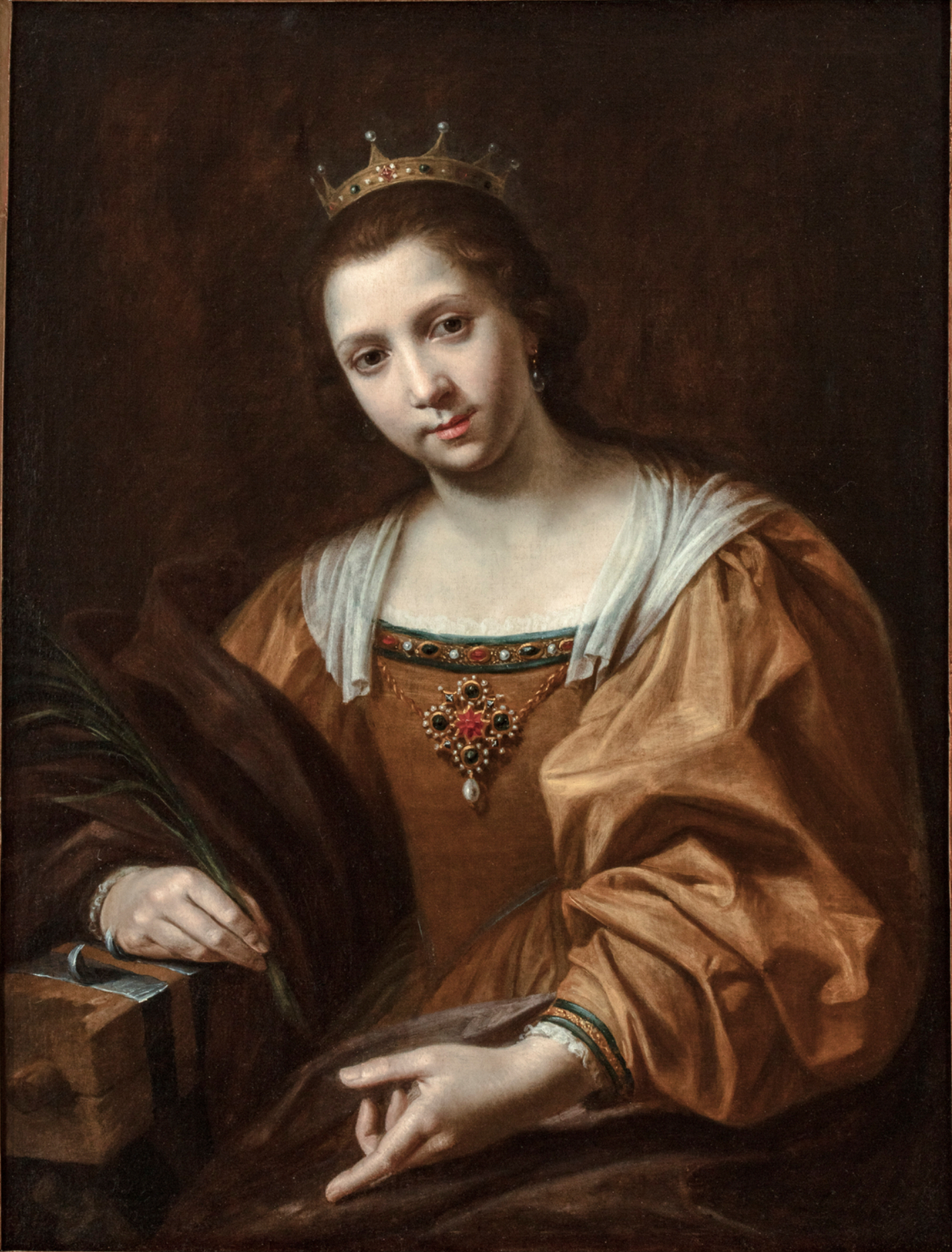
- Self-Portrait as Saint Catherine of Alexandria (c. 1624)
- Born: 24 June 1600; Velletri, Italy
- Died: 17 October 1638 (aged 38); Paris, France
- Education: Father's studio
- Known for: Painting, Drawing
- Movement: Baroque

Virginia Vezzi, sometimes given as Virginia da Vezzo (1600–1638), was an Italian painter, and the wife of French painter Simon Vouet.

== Life in Italy ==
Virginia Vezzi was born in Velletri on 24 June 1600 to Plinia Ferri, a midwife, and Pompeo Vezzi, a painter. She may have had contact with the painter Antonio Vezzi, perhaps a relative of Pompeo. Virginia initially trained with her father who recognized her talent at a young age. He decided to move the family to Rome before 1611, to allow Virginia to study from local masters. The family's home was near the church of San Nicola in Arcione. Virginia probably studied first with Marco Tullio Montagna, an artist from Velletri, and then with Cavalier d'Arpino, Gaspare Celio and Lanfranco. From 1622 to 1626, Virginia's family lived in via Ferratina (via Frattina), near the home of the French painter Simon Vouet. Simon was 10 years her senior and taught her life drawing at his home from 1623 to 1627. Virginia was now 23 and an accomplished artist. She visited Vouet's workshop to improve her technique. Cassiano dal Pozzo described her as Vouet's disciple. She painted history paintings and miniatures, and also worked in pastel.

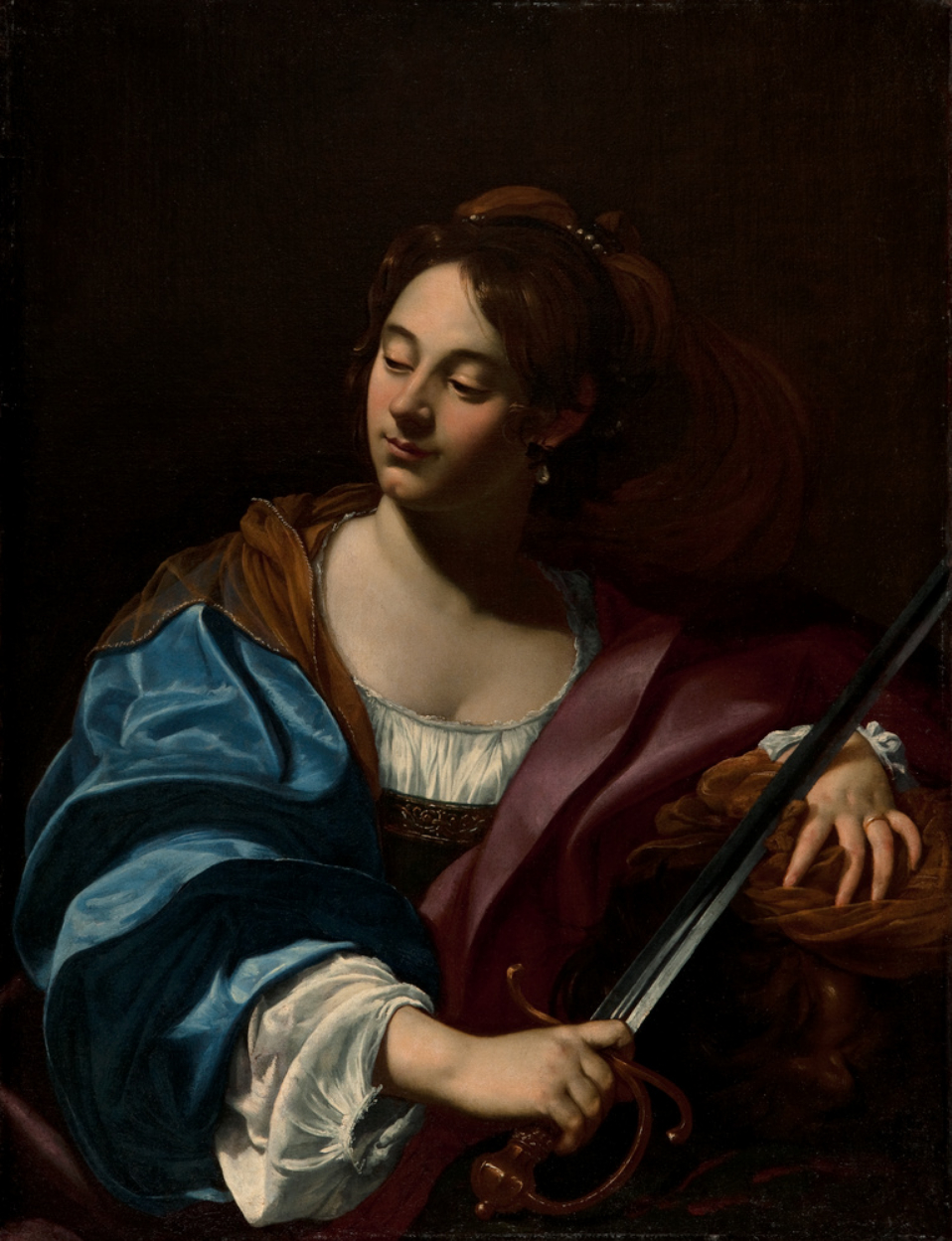
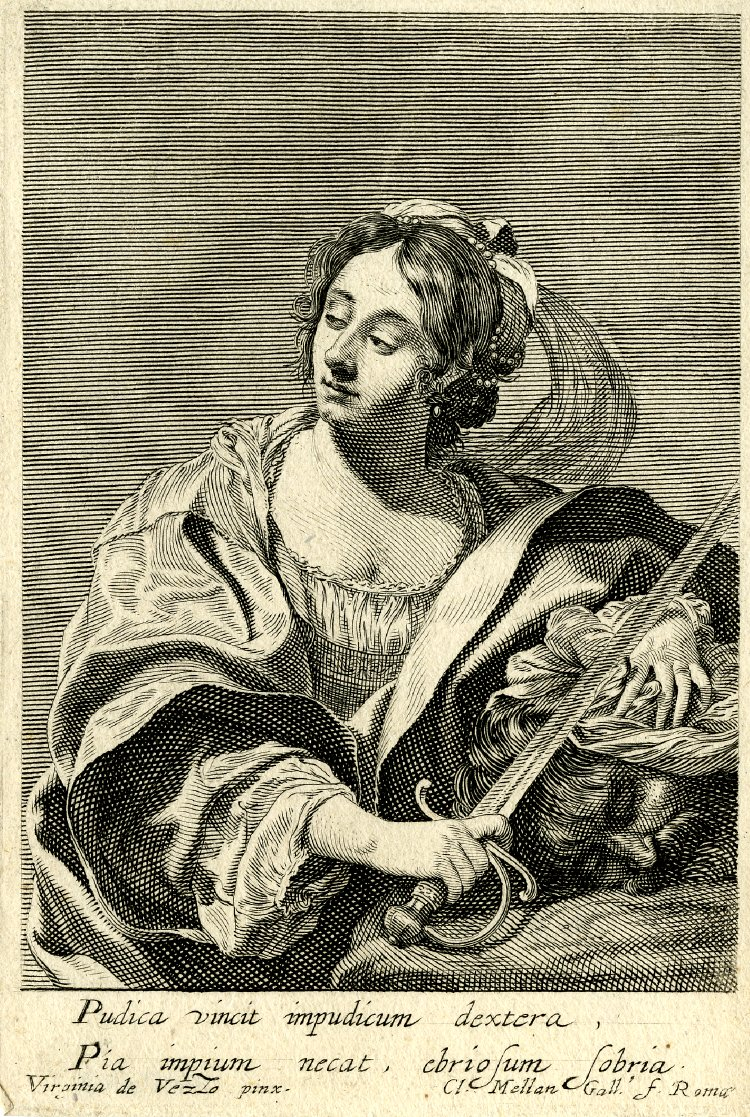
Judith with the Head of Holofernes, and Claude Mellan's engraving of the Judith with inscription "Virginia de Vezzo pinx" (painted by Virginia de Vezzo).

In 1624, Virginia was inducted as a member of the prestigious painting Accademia di San Luca, a striking accomplishment for a painter of her youth and gender. Her entrance piece was possibly a painting of the Old Testament heroine, Judith, the only certain autograph and datable painting by her: Judith with the Head of Holofernes (Musée des Beaux-Arts de Nantes), engraved by Claude Mellan in 1626. Another version of the painting was auctioned at Christie's in 2006 for EUR 64,480. In 1624, Simon was also elected president of the Academy.

In 1626, Virginia Vezzi and Simon Vouet were married in the church of San Lorenzo in Lucina, their home parish and also the church associated with French painters in Rome. In this church, Vouet was responsible for the decoration of the Alaleoni Chapel; Virginia probably assisted him, particularly in the painting of the angels. In 1626, Marcello Giovannetti, a friend of the couple, published a book of poems, including a sonnet dedicated to a painting of Danae by Virginia.

== Life in France ==
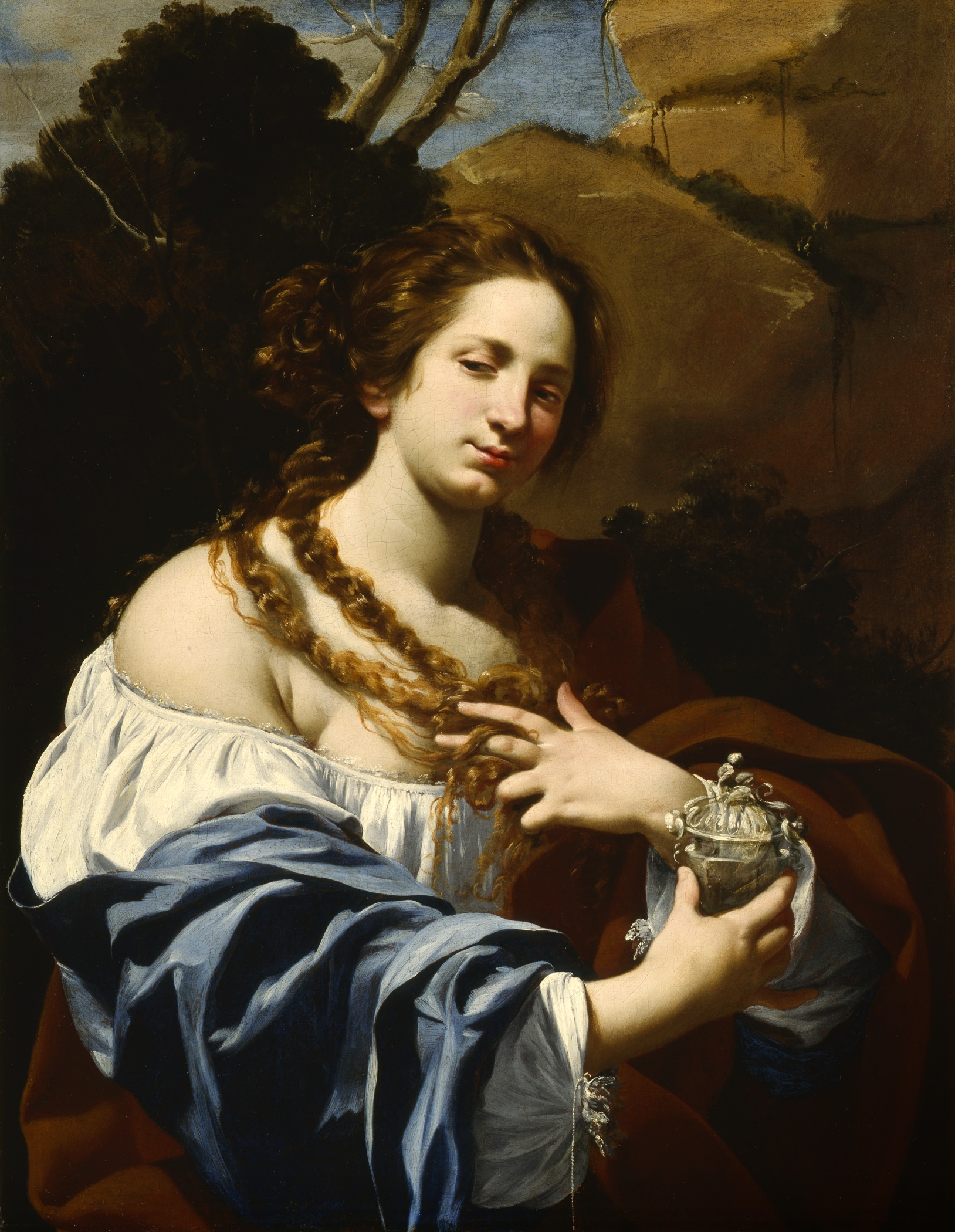
Simon Vouet, Virginia da Vezzo, the Artist's Wife, as the Magdalen (c. 1627), LACMA.

Virginia married Simon Vouet in Rome in 1626 and the following year moved with him to his native France, where Simon, as Premier peintre du Roi, was given lodgings in the Louvre in Paris. Virginia was "known for her beauty...and she often served as the model for her husband's Magdalenes, Madonnas, and mythological heroines." (See for example Virginia da Vezzo, the Artist's Wife, as the Magdalen at LACMA, Saint Cecilia at the Blanton Museum of Art, and The Holy Family with the Infant Saint John the Baptist at the Legion of Honor in San Francisco.) She also "augmented the teaching activities of her husband by offering drawing lessons to young ladies of good family, thereby beginning a custom traditionally associated with the Louvre."

The seventeenth-century French scholar Isaac Bullart described her as

...Dame Romaine d'une beauté singuliere, et si bien instruite en l'Art de peindre qu'elle eut souvent l'honneur de travailler en la présence du Roy & de recevoir de sa bouche les loüanges qui estoient deües aux ouvrages de sa belle main, que la France voit encore dans les curieuses estampes qu’on en a mises au jour. (...a Roman lady of singular beauty, and so well instructed in the art of painting that she often had the honor of working in the presence of the King and receiving from his lips words of praise for the works of her beautiful hand, which France still sees in curious prints that have come to light.)

It has been speculated that she may have played a role in her husband's atelier but, aside from the Self-Portrait or Muse attributed to her by Consuelo Lollobrigida, there remains "a lack of evidence for her activity as a painter during her years in the French capital."

Virginia and Simon had five children. She died in Paris on October 17, 1638.

== Other paintings attributed to Vezzi ==
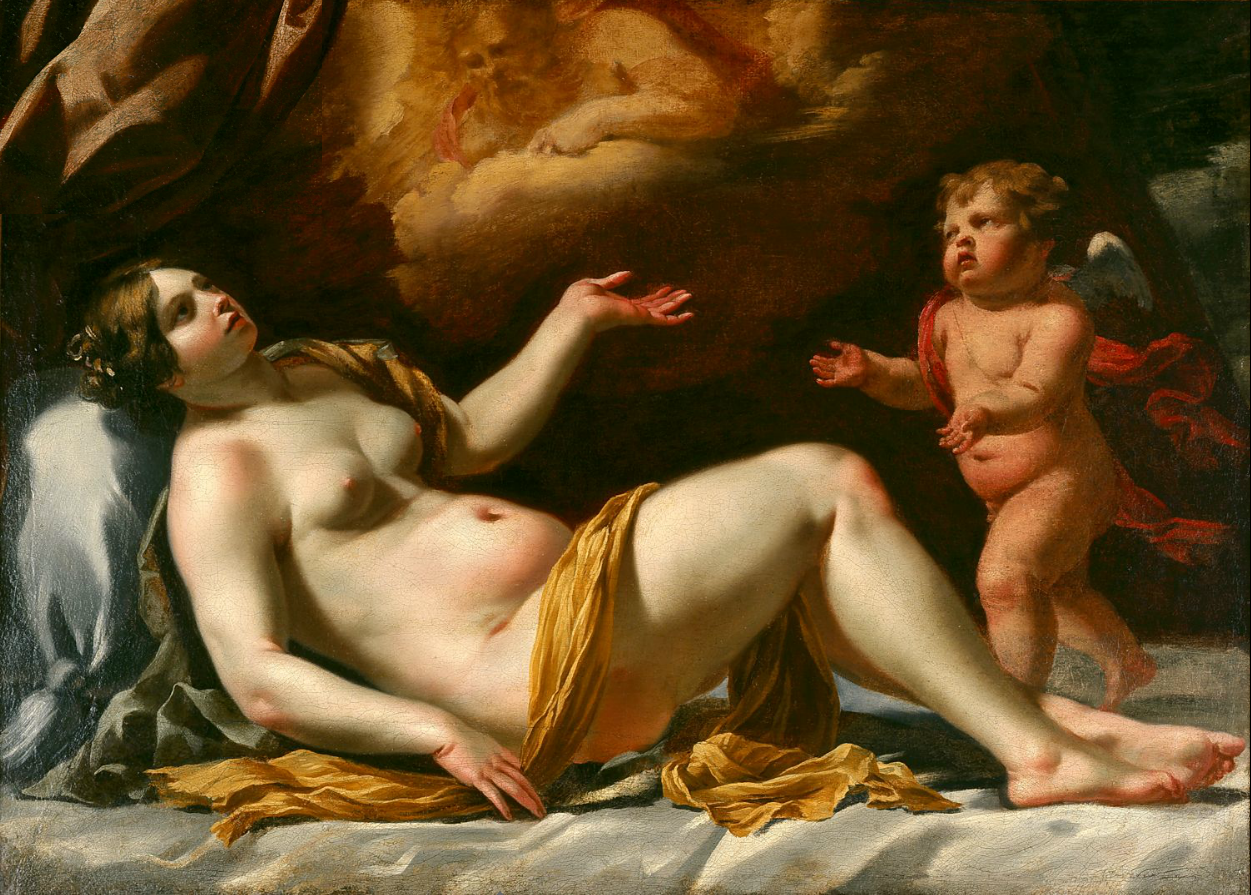
Danaë (1620-1630) by Jacques Blanchard (or Virginia Vezzi?) at the Blanton Museum of Art.

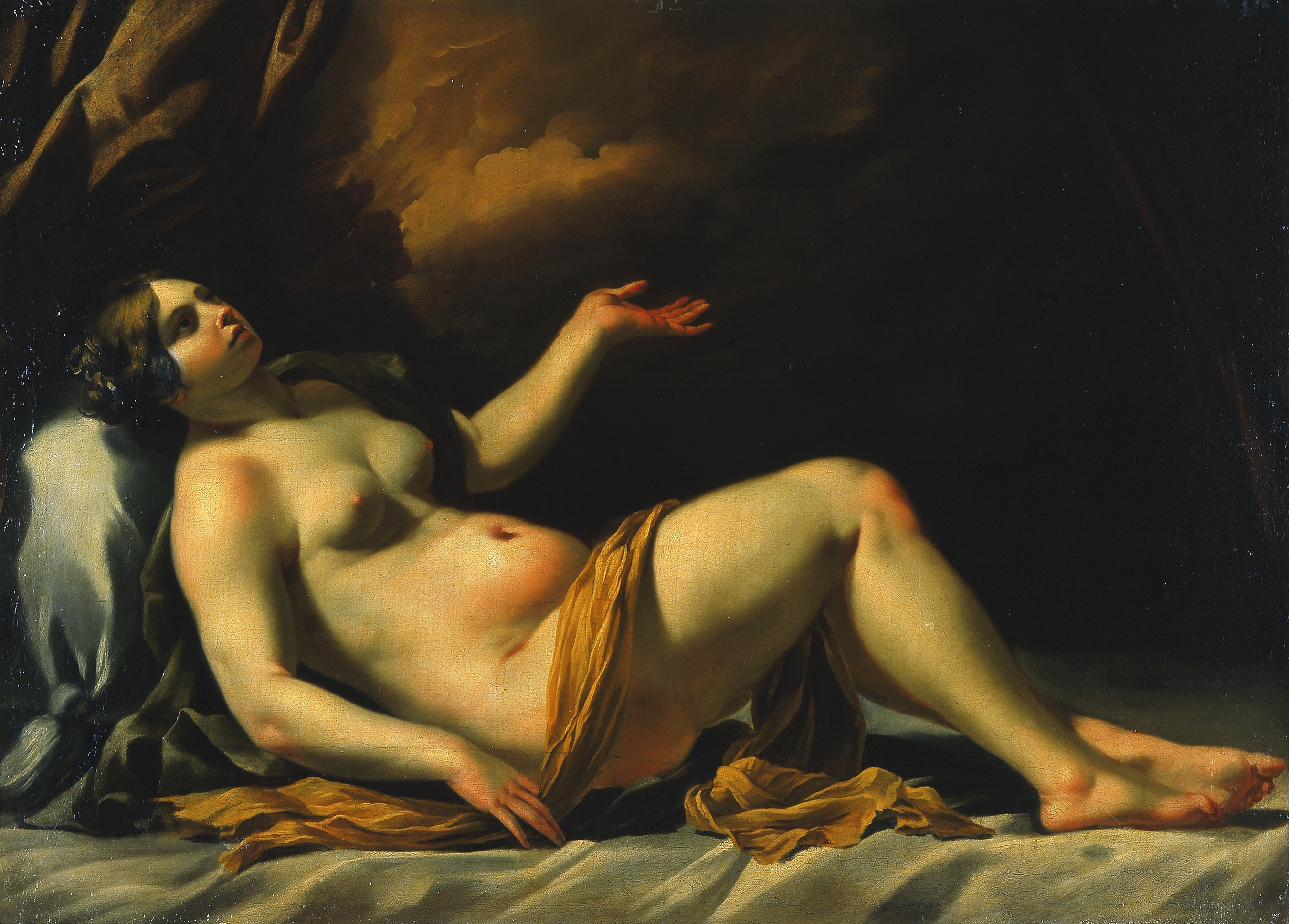
The Blanton Danaë before the restoration that uncovered the putto and Jupiter.

A handful of other paintings have been attributed to Vezzi. All but one are roughly datable to her years in Rome.

David Mandrella has suggested an attribution to Vezzi for another Judith, this one at the Alte Pinakothek in Munich (see Gallery), currently attributed to Simon Vouet, but Mandrella's argument "does not convince" longtime Vouet/Vezzi scholar Arnaud Brejon de Lavergnée.

Dr. Consuelo Lollobrigida has attributed other paintings to Vezzi, including Self-portrait or Muse (1630-1632) in a French private collection (this would date to Vezzi's time in Paris; see Gallery); an Allegory of Painting (c. 1620) in an Italian private collection, which Lollobrigida believes to be a self-portrait of Vezzi in the act of painting the young Simon Vouet (see Gallery); and Self-Portrait as Saint Catherine of Alexandria (c. 1624).

In 1992, Vouet specialist William R. Crelly suggested that Vezzi may have painted the Danaë at the Blanton Museum of Art in Austin. Subsequently, a restoration of the painting uncovered a putto and an image of Jupiter that prompted the Blanton to attribute the Danaë to Jacques Blanchard (who painted another Danaë, at the Musée des Beaux-Arts de Lyon). But as recently as 2013, art historian Guillaume Kazerouni has disputed the Blanchard attribution and repeated the suggestion that the Blanton Danaë may be by Virginia Vezzi.

Another painting, of a woman in a red dress with a blue cloak and a cream shawl (see Gallery), has been attributed to Vezzi by Kazerouni and another art historian, Adeline Collange, who both believe it may be a self-portrait; however, Arnauld and Barbara Brejon de Lavergnée do not believe the painting depicts Virginia Vezzi.

An oil on copper Crucifixion has been listed as "attributed to Virginia Vezzi" by the Matthiesen Gallery in London (see Gallery).

== Gallery ==
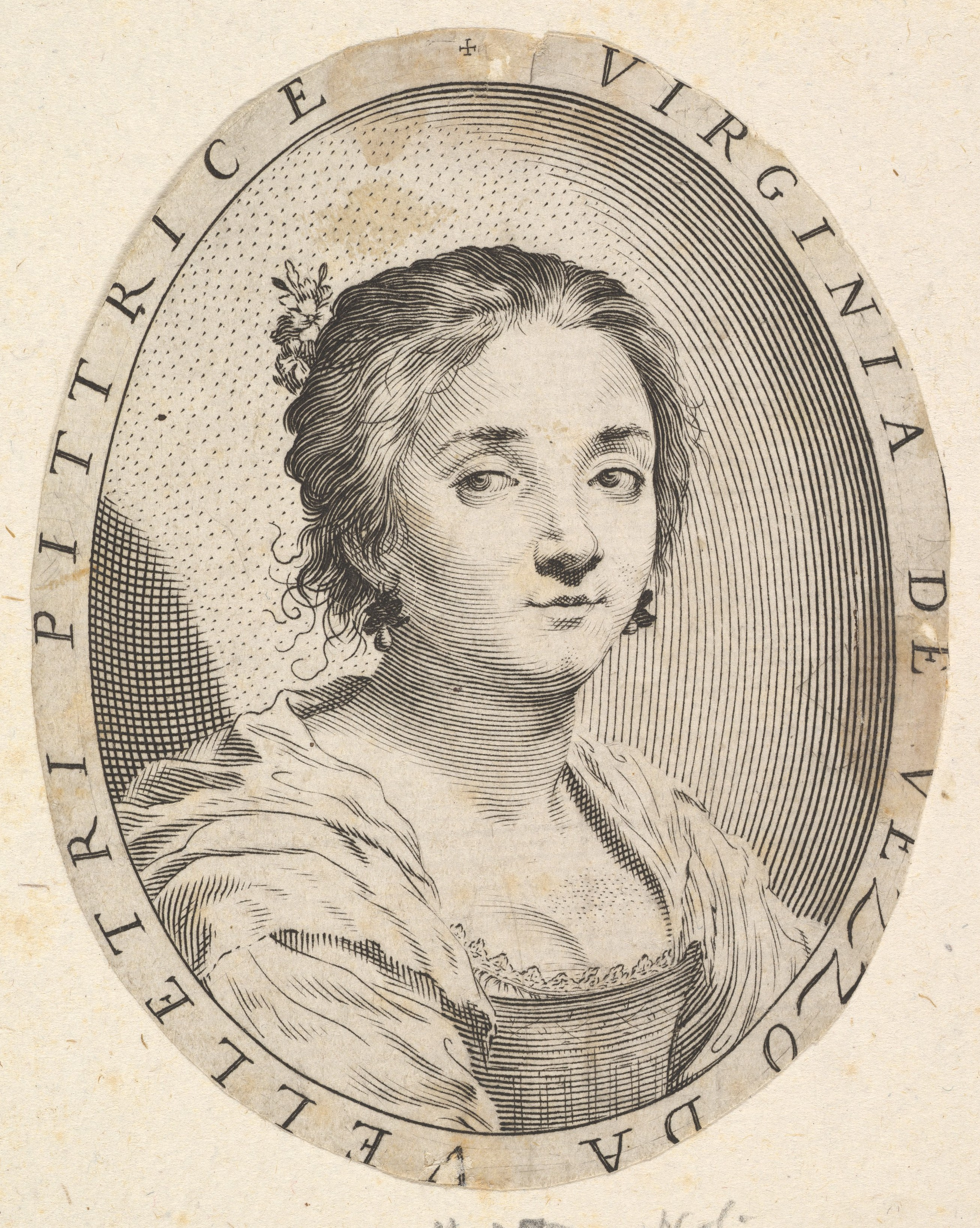
Virginia da Vezzo, portrait engraving by Claude Mellan, 1626, Metropolitan Museum.

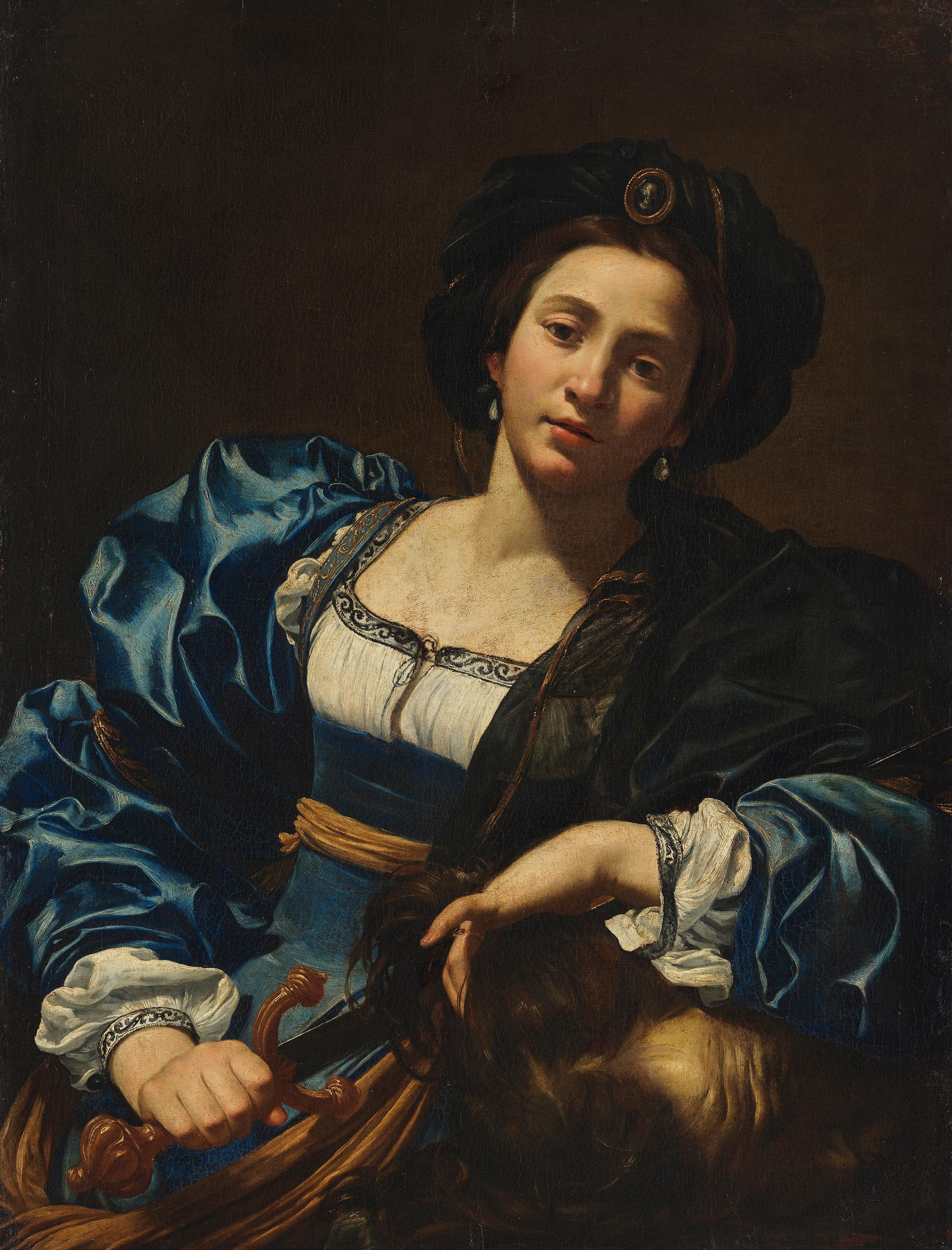
Judith (c.1620-1625) by Simon Vouet (or Virginia Vezzi?), Alte Pinakothek.

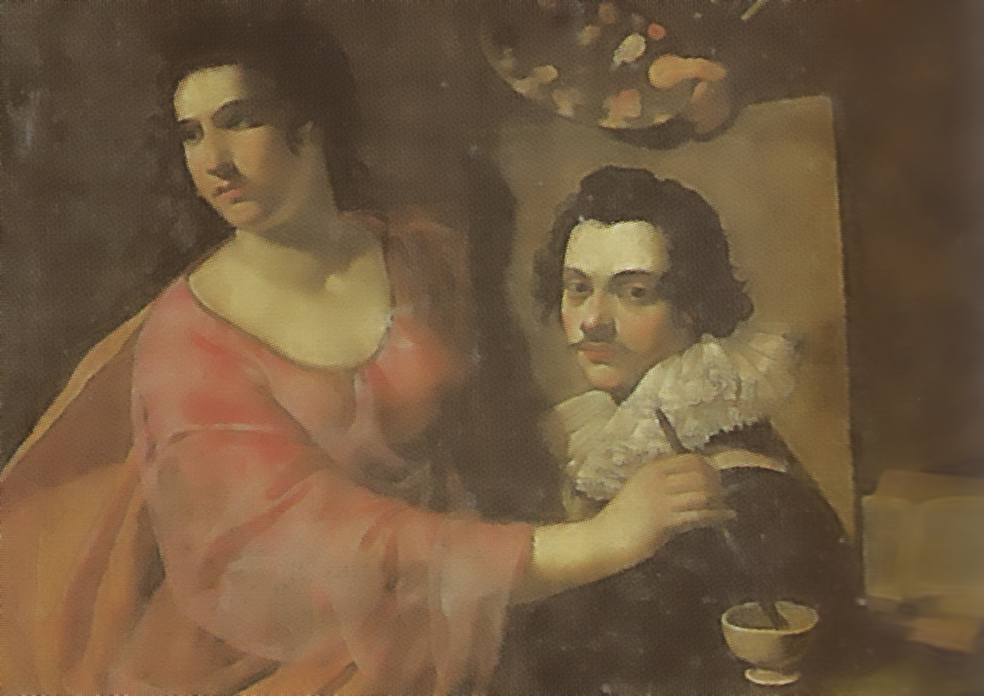
Allegory of Painting (c. 1620), a self-portrait of Virginia Vezzi painting the young Simon Vouet?

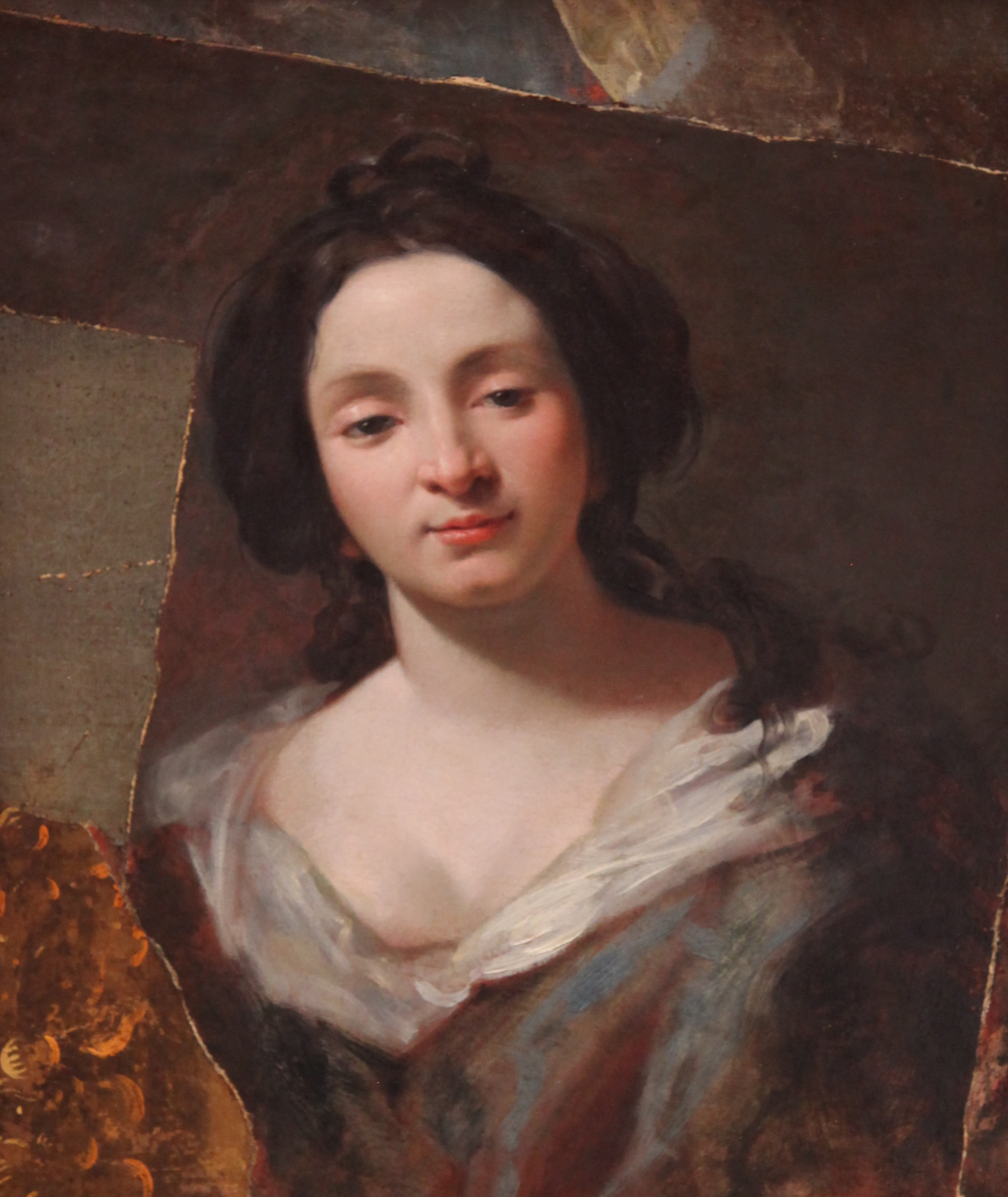
Simon Vouet, fragment of a possible portrait of Virginia Vezzi (c. 1624-26), Gemäldegalerie, Berlin

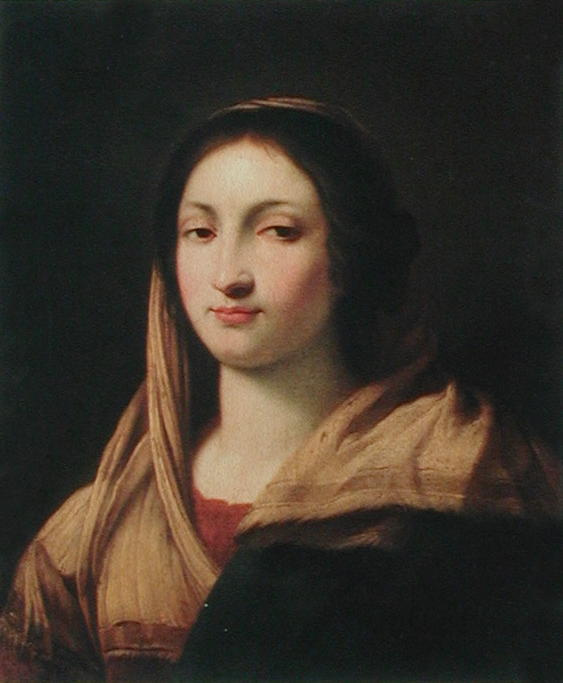
Painting attributed to Virginia Vezzi, possibly a self-portrait.

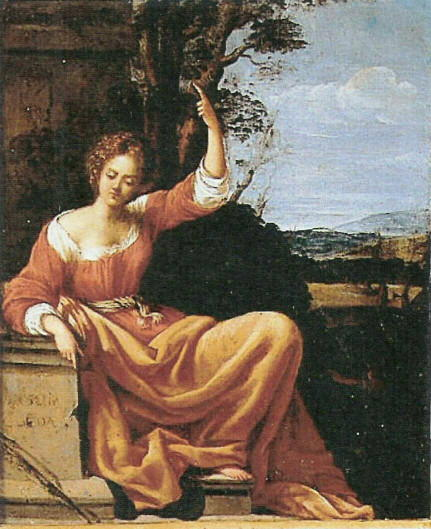
Self-Portrait or Muse, attributed by Lollobrigida to Virginia Vezzi (1630-1632).

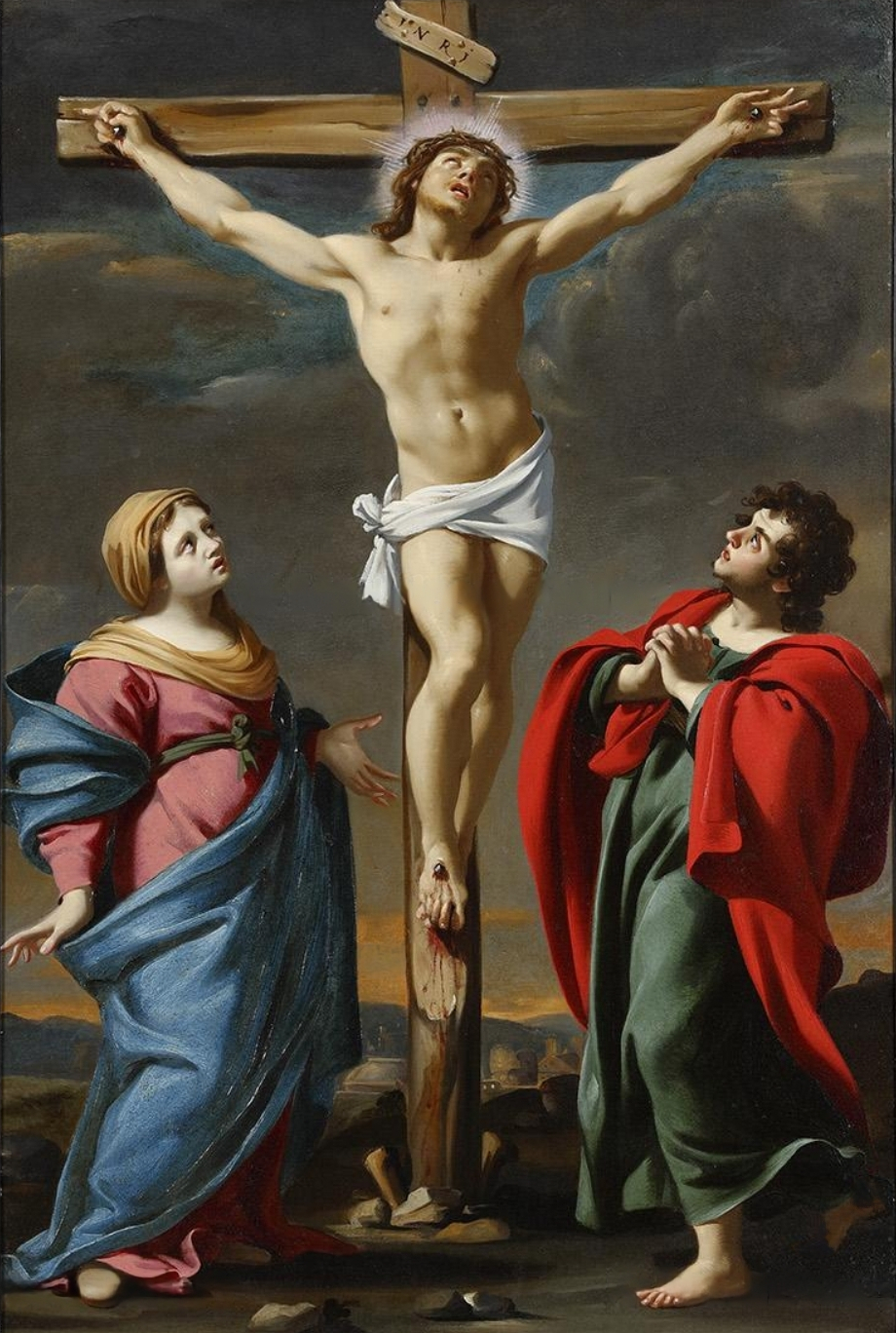
Crucifixion, oil on copper, attributed to Virginia Vezzi at the Matthiesen Gallery, London.
