= Danaë (Tintoretto) =

Painting by Tintoretto

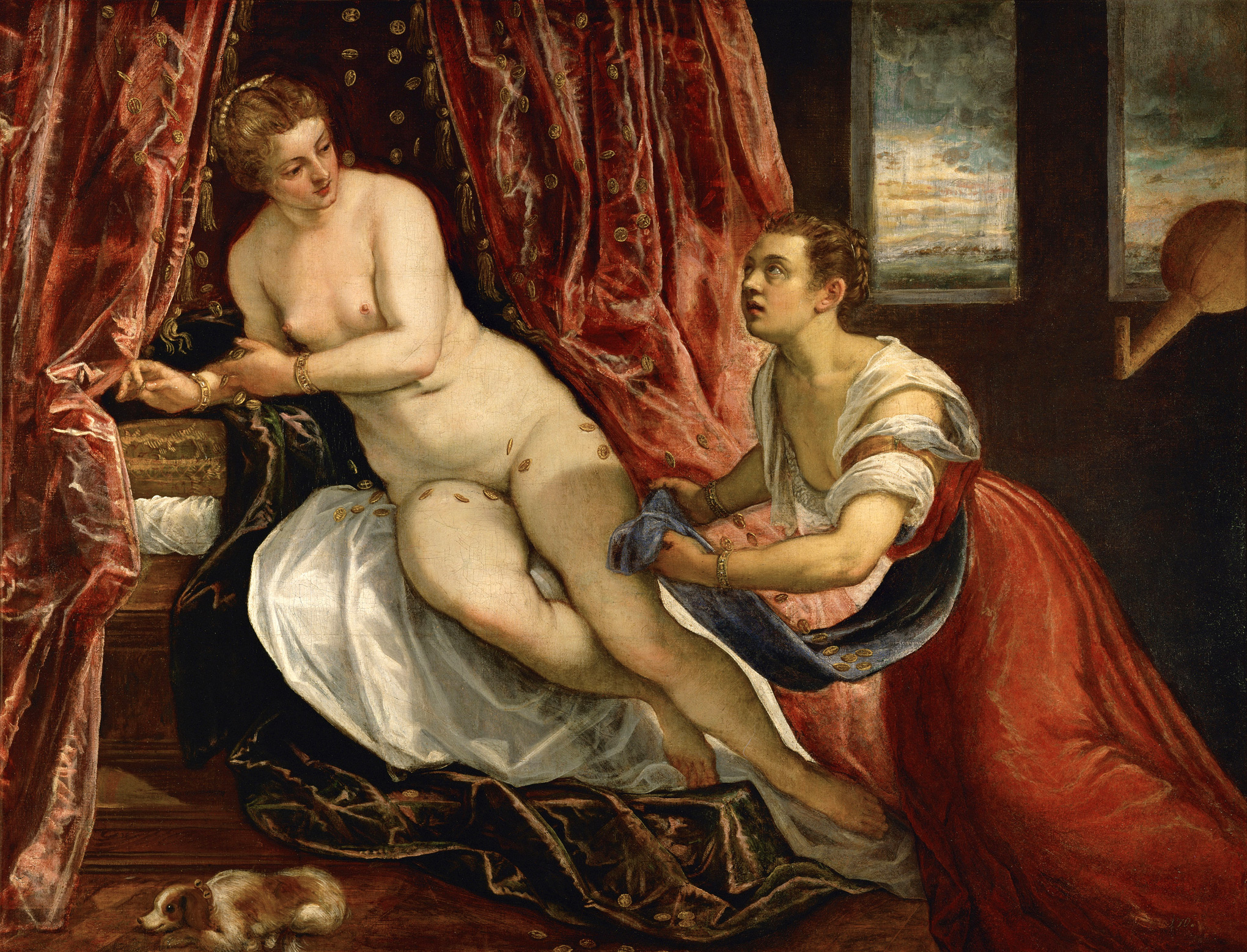
- Artist: Tintoretto
- Year: c. 1570
- Type: Oil on canvas
- Dimensions: 142 cm × 182 cm (56 in × 72 in)
- Location: Museum of Fine Arts of Lyon, Lyon

Danaë is an oil painting by the Italian artist Tintoretto, from c. 1570. It was acquired by the Museum of Fine Arts of Lyon in 1811, where it still hangs.

== Description ==
The canvas depicts a scene from the legend of Zeus and Danaë. According to the legend, King Acrisius of Argos was warned by an oracle that he would be killed by his own grandson. To frustrate the prediction, he locked up his beautiful only daughter Danaë in a specially constructed bronze chamber. However, Zeus, king of the gods, desired her so much that he managed to enter the chamber as a shower of golden rain, and impregnated her. A child was born, whom she named Perseus. He would later, with the help of his father and other gods, kill the Gorgon Medusa. Later the oracle's prophecy came true when Perseus accidentally killed his grandfather during a throwing event at the Larissa athletic games.

The scene portrays Danaë instructing her maidservant to collect golden leaves from her nether regions, whose presence there suggested that Zeus' tactic had been successful.
