= Danaë (Blanchard) =

Painting by Jacques Blanchard

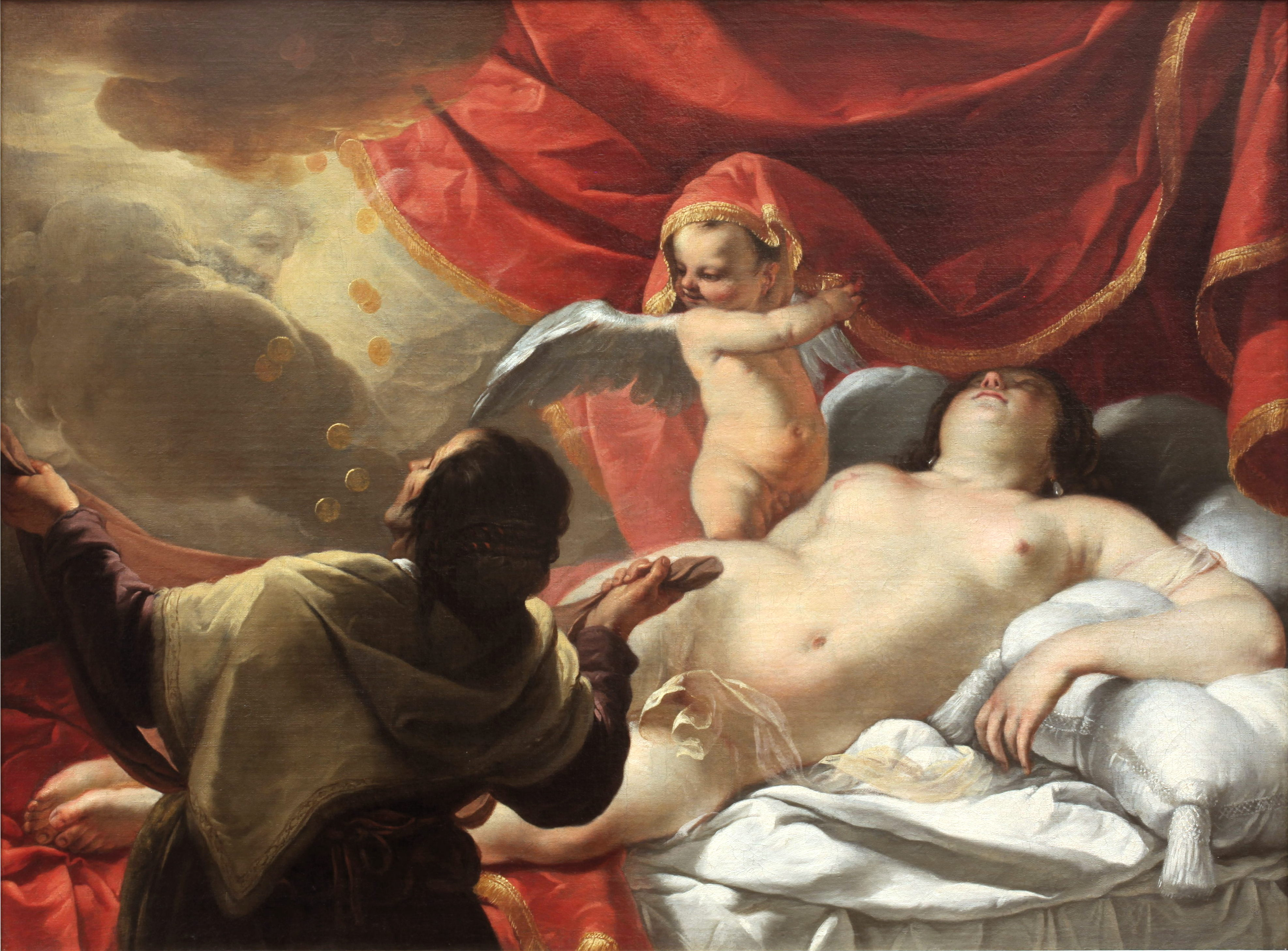
Danaë at the Musée des Beaux-Arts de Lyon.

Danaë is an oil painting on canvas of 1631–1633 by the French artist Jacques Blanchard, now in the Musée des Beaux-Arts de Lyon in France. It shows Danaë receiving Jupiter in the form of a shower of gold, a union that results in the birth of Perseus.

Blanchard is also thought to have painted another Danaë, this one part of the Suida-Manning Collection acquired in 1998 by the Blanton Art Museum in Austin, Texas. The attribution was made after a restoration of the painting c. 2012 uncovered a previously painted-over putto and an image of Jupiter, which not only identified the mythological subject, but bore stylistic markers of Blanchard's work. In 1992, art historian William R. Crelly had suggested that Virginia da Vezzo (the wife of Simon Vouet) painted the Blanton Danaë. Even after the restoration, as recently as 2013, art historian Guillaume Kazerouni has disputed the Blanchard attribution and repeated the suggestion that the Blanton Danaë may be the work of Virginia da Vezzo.

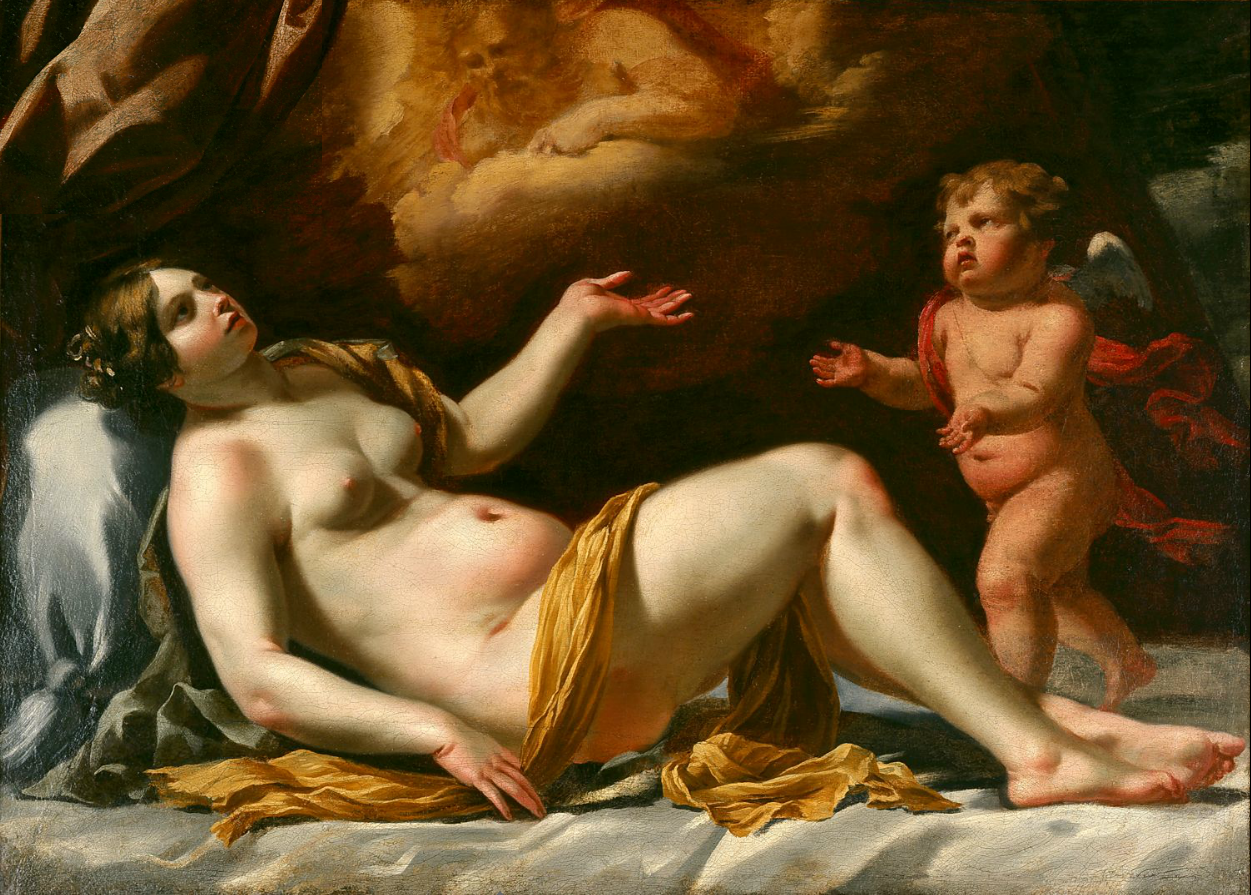
Danaë (1620–1630) by Jacques Blanchard (or Virginia da Vezzo?) at the Blanton Museum of Art in Austin, after restoration.

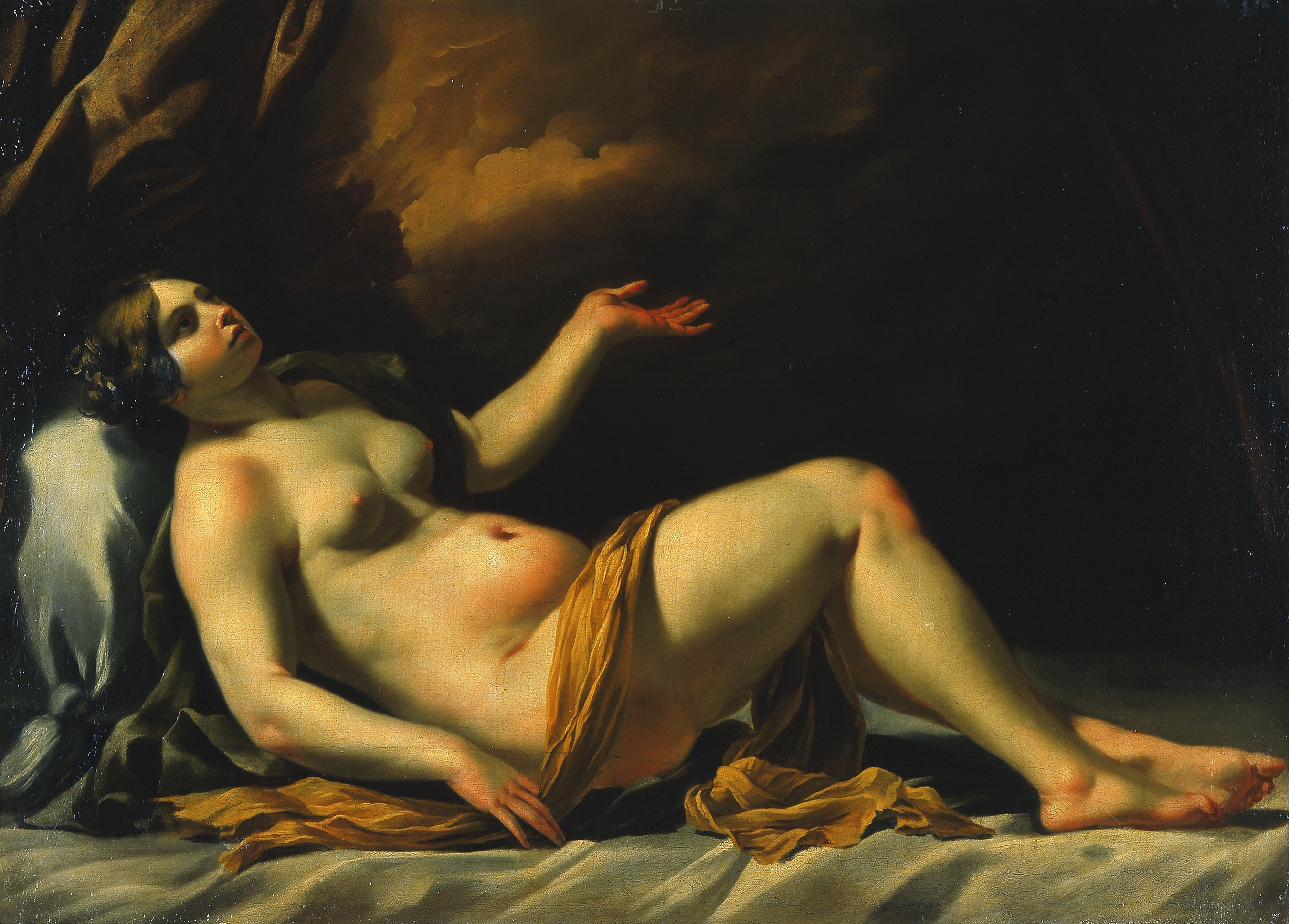
The Blanton "Danaë" as it appeared before the restoration that uncovered the putto and the image of Jupiter.

== Bibliography ==
- Jacques Blanchard, catalogue exposition Rennes 6 mars au 8 juin 1998 Jacques Thuillier
