= Mount Danae =

Mountain in Fiordland, New Zealand

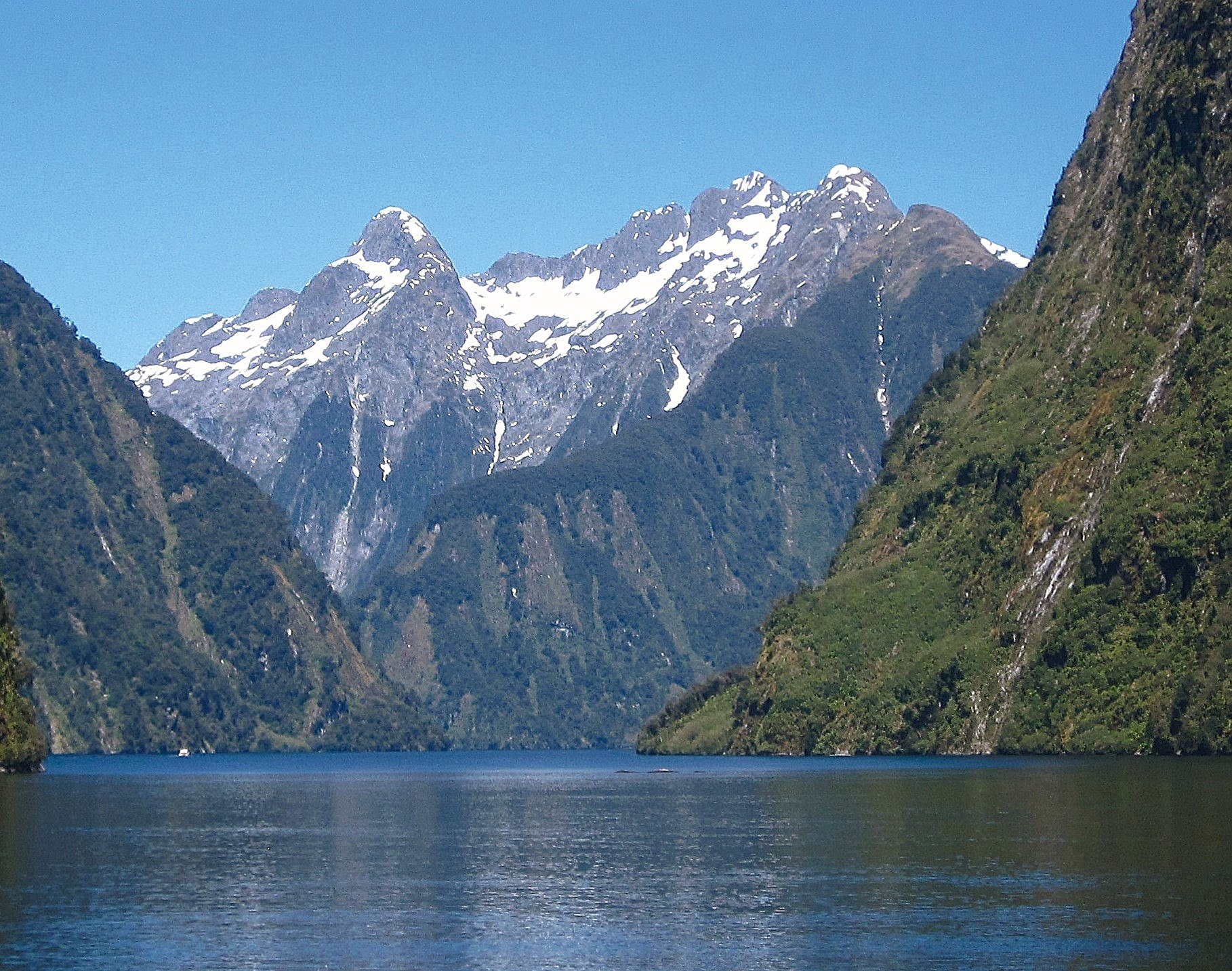
- Northeast aspect

Highest point
- Elevation: 1,495 m (4,905 ft)
- Prominence: 755 m (2,477 ft)
- Isolation: 5.41 km (3.36 mi)
- Coordinates: 45°30′10″S 167°01′58″E

Naming
- Etymology: Danaë

Geography
- Location within New Zealand
- Interactive map of Mount Danae
- Location: South Island
- Country: New Zealand
- Region: Southland
- Protected area: Fiordland National Park
- Topo map: Topo50 CD06

Geology
- Rock type: Metamorphic rock (Orthogneiss)

Mount Danae is a 1,495-metre-elevation (4,905-foot) mountain in Fiordland, New Zealand.

== Description ==
Mount Danae is located in the Southland Region of the South Island. It is set within Fiordland National Park which is part of the Te Wahipounamu UNESCO World Heritage Site. The mountain is situated between the head of the Hall Arm of Doubtful Sound / Patea and the head of the Vancouver Arm of Breaksea Sound. Precipitation runoff from the mountain's slopes drains to Hall Arm of Doubtful Sound. Topographic relief is significant as the summit rises above tidewater of Hall Arm in less than two kilometres. The nearest higher neighbour is Mount Crowfoot, five kilometres to the south.

== Etymology ==
The mountain's toponym was submitted by G.A. Howard in January 1964 and has been officially approved by the New Zealand Geographic Board. In Greek mythology, the oracle of Delphi announced to King Acrisius that he would never have a son, but his daughter Danaë would, and that he would be killed by his daughter's son. At the time, Danaë was childless and, intending to keep her so, King Acrisius enclosed her in a bronze chamber constructed under the court of his palace. She was buried in this tomb, with the intent that she be closed off from all others for the rest of her life. However, Zeus, the king of the gods, desired her, and came to her in the form of golden rain which streamed in through the roof of the subterranean chamber and down into her womb. Soon after, their child Perseus was born.

== Climate ==
Based on the Köppen climate classification, Mount Danae is located in a marine west coast climate zone. Prevailing westerly winds blow moist air from the Tasman Sea onto the mountains, where the air is forced upward by the mountains (orographic lift), causing moisture to drop in the form of rain or snow. The months of December through February offer the most favourable weather for viewing or climbing this peak.

== See also ==
- List of mountains of New Zealand by height
