= Giuseppe Cesari =

Italian Mannerist painter (1568–1640)

Cavalier Giuseppe Cesari KSOC
- Self-portrait, 1640, Accademia di San Luca
- Born: 14 February 1568; Rome, Papal States
- Died: 3 July 1640 (aged 72); Rome, Papal States
- Other name: Cavaliere d'Arpino
- Education: Niccolò Pomarancio
- Known for: Historical and religious painting
- Notable work: Perseus Rescuing Andromeda (1593–94)
- Movement: Mannerism
- Patrons: Pope Gregory XIII; Pope Clement VIII; Giulio Antonio Santorio; Paolo Emilio Sfondrati; Alessandro Peretti di Montalto

Giuseppe Cesari (14 February 1568 – 3 July 1640) was an Italian Mannerist painter, also named Il Giuseppino and called Cavaliere d'Arpino, because he was created Knight of the Supreme Order of Christ by his patron Pope Clement VIII. He was much patronized in Rome by both Clement and Sixtus V. He was the chief of the studio in which Caravaggio trained upon the younger painter's arrival in Rome.

== Biography ==
=== Early career ===
Cesari's father, Muzio Cesari, had been a native of Arpino, but Giuseppe himself was born in Rome. His precocious talent for drawing led his mother to take him to Rome in 1581–2, where he became a colour mixer under Niccolò Pomarancio, one of the leading painters in Rome during the second half of the sixteenth century. Pomarancio introduced him to the court of Pope Gregory XIII. During 1583 Giuseppe worked at the Vatican on the monochrome figure of Samson with the Gates of Gaza in the Sala Vecchia degli Svizzeri and the restoration of the Prophets and Virtues painted by the Raphael workshop in the Sala dei Palafrenieri.

Probably in 1584–5 he contributed a fresco of the Canonization of St. Francis of Paola to the decoration of the cloister of Trinità dei Monti, Rome, begun by Cristoforo Roncalli. The painting is very damaged but still visible; among the figures in the crowd is probably Giuseppe’s first self-portrait. There are also some beautifully realized foreground figures: a chalk study of a Michelangelesque nude for one of these survives (Florence, Uffizi).

=== Early major commissions ===
In 1585 Giuseppe returned to the service of Pope Gregory XIII, painting decorative friezes in the newly built Quirinal Palace. His standing in Rome now seemed assured: he was a member of the Accademia di San Luca, and in 1586 he was admitted to the Pontifical Academy of Fine Arts and Letters of the Virtuosi al Pantheon. He had been commissioned by Cardinal Giulio Antonio Santorio to paint frescoes of the Crucifixion of Jesus and the Assumption of Mary in Sant'Atanasio (1588–91) and the decoration for Santorio’s palace (now part of the Palazzo Montecitorio).

A more important commission of the same period was for frescoes in San Lorenzo in Damaso for Cardinal Alessandro Farnese. These included two narrative scenes (untraced): a vivid bozzetto (London, priv. col.) and a pedestrian copy (Rome, Boncompagni, priv. col.) of St. Lawrence among the Sick show dignified groups dominated by elaborate architecture in a classicizing composition reminiscent of contemporary Florentine Mannerism. A third fresco of three angels is fresher and more immediate.

In 1589 Giuseppe’s most influential current patron, Cardinal Farnese, died. As he had no introduction to the court of Pope Sixtus V, he eagerly accepted an invitation to decorate the murals of the choir vault of the Certosa di San Martino, Naples. He completed a canvas of the Crucifixion (1591), in which the simplicity of Counter-Reformation arte sacra combines with the grace and vivid colour of Federico Barocci to create a movingly original work. His scenes from the Life of Christ, with attendant Prophets and Carthusian Saints, were unfinished when he returned to Rome in 1591; they were completed by his brother, Bernardino, who assisted him in many of his works.

=== Mature work ===
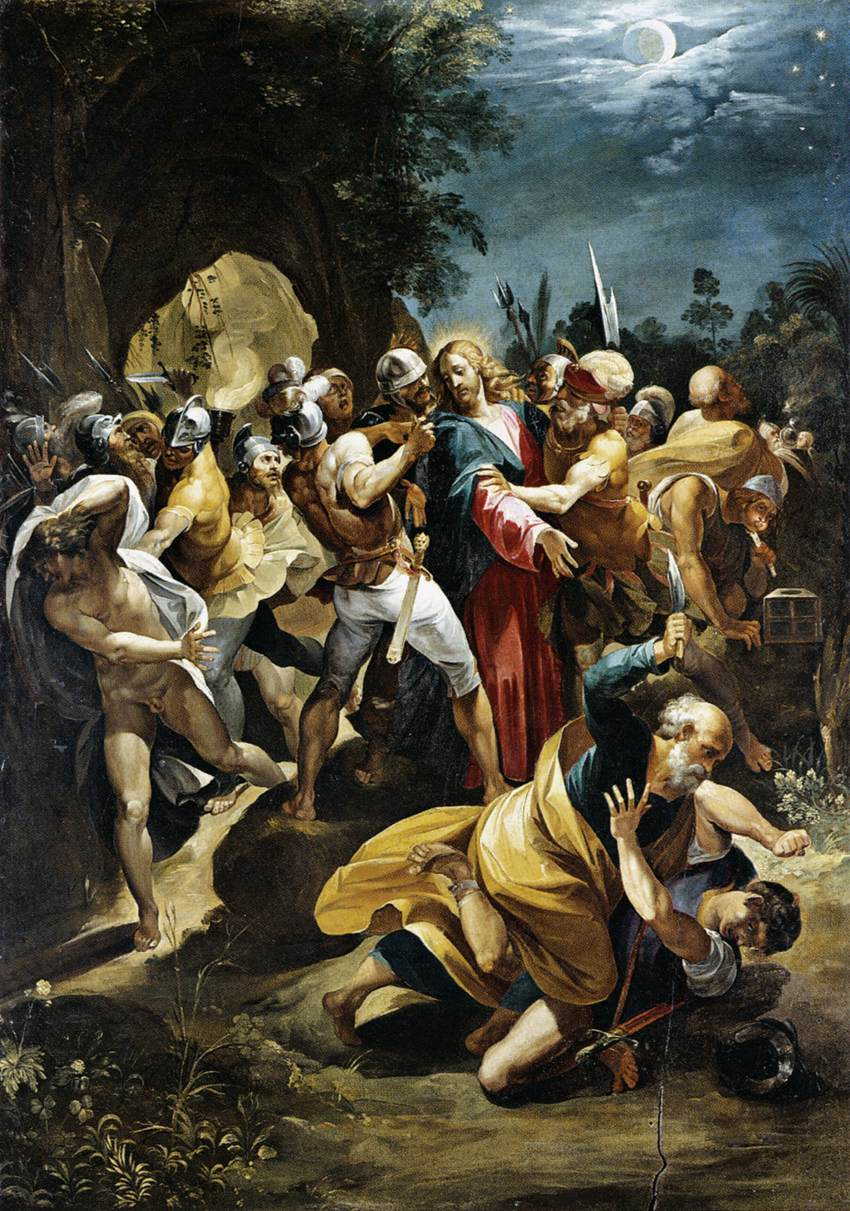
Christ Taken Prisoner, c. 1597, Museumslandschaft Hessen Kassel

On his return to Rome, Giuseppe received the commission to paint the vault of the Contarelli Chapel in San Luigi dei Francesi with small scenes in elaborate stuccowork. It was probably at this time that Caravaggio became a member of his studio: he certainly owned two of Caravaggio’s early works (Rome, Galleria Borghese). In 1592 Cardinal Ippolito Aldobrandini was elected Pope Clement VIII, and Giuseppe became his principal painter. The artist’s re-entry into court circles was perhaps due to Bernardo Olgiati, the papal treasurer.

The frescoes in the Olgiati Chapel (Rome, Santa Prassede), although commissioned in 1587, were probably executed at this time. The frescoes are considered among Arpino's masterpieces. Particularly outstanding are the superbly realized Resurrection and the Ascension, in which a consistent but separate illusion with a di sotto in sù perspective enlivens a radically simple composition. A similar style informed Giuseppe’s decoration of a loggia in the palazzo of Corradino Orsini (1594–5; Rome, Pio Sodalizio dei Piceni) with light-hearted frescoes of the Loves of the Gods and Labours of Hercules, completing a scheme begun by Federico Zuccari in 1589.

In the mid-1590s Giuseppe gained commissions from members of the papal family, particularly the Pope’s powerful nephew, Cardinal Pietro Aldobrandini. He provided an altarpiece of St. Barbara (1594–7) for the chapel of the Bombardieri in Santa Maria in Traspontina, Rome, built by the Cardinal; the saint’s figure and attendant angel display an elaborated yet direct classicism, which moves the style of Raphael quite clearly in the direction of Guido Reni. He also painted the altarpiece of the Annunciation and frescoes of the Adoration of the Shepherds and the Adoration of the Magi (1596) for the funerary chapel of the Cardinal’s uncle, another Pietro Aldobrandini, in Santa Maria in Via, Rome.

Giuseppe’s most important commission from Cardinal Aldobrandini was the fresco decoration of the Palazzo dei Conservatori on the Capitoline Hill in Rome with a series of Histories of Ancient Rome, which occupied him intermittently for the rest of his life. The Discovery of Romulus and Remus (1595–7), a superb composition full of life and movement, has graceful figures brilliantly disposed before and within a landscape setting that is both decorative and realistic. The Battle between the Romans and the Men of Veii and Fidenae (1597–1601) is more conventional, directly recalling Raphael but again enlivened with charmingly naturalistic landscape details.

In 1598 Giuseppe painted two canvases for the Baptistery of Saint John Lateran: St. John the Evangelist Led to his Tomb (Old Sacristy), a sombre scene of large figures before a bleak landscape, and St. John Drinking the Tyrant’s Poison (untraced). The following year he began supervising the decoration of the main church’s transepts; he personally contributed a large fresco of the Ascension (1599–1601). In recognition of his work he was made a Knight of the Supreme Order of Christ by Clement VIII; he had also been elected president of the Accademia di San Luca in 1599. He decorated Cardinal Pietro Aldobrandini’s magnificent villa at Frascati with seven Old Testament scenes in fresco (1602–3), which, despite their quality, demonstrate a retreat to Mannerist norms.

The high-point of Cavaliere d’Arpino’s papal patronage was his undertaking in 1603 to design the mosaics of the dome of St. Peter's Basilica. This vast project occupied most of the following decade. The repetitious display of Apostles, Saints, Angels and other figures is pictorially disappointing, but the overall effect enhances the architecture.

=== Later career ===
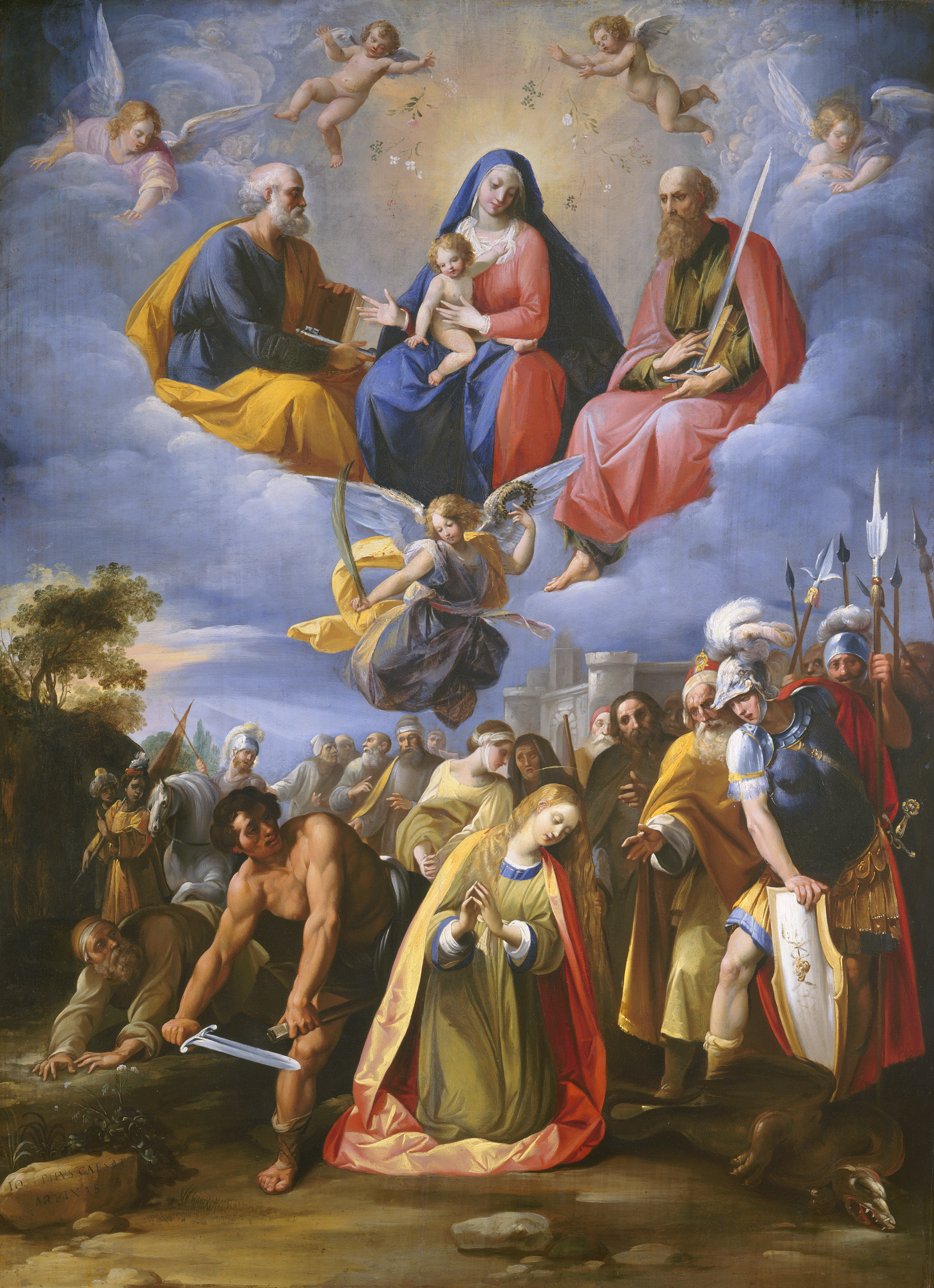
Martyrdom of Saint Margaret, c. 1608-1611, National Gallery of Art, Washington, D.C.

In 1605 Clement VIII was succeeded by Pope Paul V, whose nephew, Cardinal Scipione Borghese, had Arpino arrested in 1607 and confiscated his collection of 105 pictures, which still hang in the Cardinal’s villa, now the Galleria Borghese. Arpino’s humiliation appears to have affected his art, as can be gauged by another fresco at the Palazzo dei Conservatori, the Fight between the Horatii and the Curatii (1612), in which the rich liveliness of his previous scenes has been reduced to a dignified but melancholy stasis.

From 1610 he was in charge of the decoration of the Pope’s future funerary chapel, the Cappella Paolina in Santa Maria Maggiore. Here he supervised important contributions from Guido Reni and Ludovico Cigoli and painted turgid figures of Prophets in the pendentives and a schematic Virgin with St. Gregory above the altar. A tender and beautiful drawing for the figure of St. Gregory (Frankfurt am Main, Städel) shows that Giuseppe’s artistic ideas, if not their execution, were still fresh. In 1613–14 Arpino supervised the decoration, by Agostino Tassi and Orazio Gentileschi, among others, of the new casino of Cardinal Alessandro Peretti di Montalto’s villa at Bagnaia (now Villa Lante). The extent of his own contribution is difficult to determine, but some friezes of animals and putti have been convincingly attributed to his hand. In 1617 he was involved in similar work at the Quirinal Palace.

=== Barberini Rome ===
The explosion of artistic activity in Rome under Pope Urban VIII drew Arpino once more into prominence. In 1629 he painted scenes of the Birth of the Virgin and Death of the Virgin for the choir of Santa Maria di Loreto, Rome. In 1629 he was elected for a third term as president of the Accademia di San Luca. He resumed his series of frescoes in the Palazzo dei Conservatori, though with even less success. The Institution of Religion, Rape of the Sabine Women (much restored) and Foundation of Rome (all 1635–40) display disappointingly rigid compositions and lifeless figures, although some felicitous landscape features in the last recall the time when his confident, colourful, lively and lavish art prefigured elements of the Baroque. Arpino died in Rome in 1640, at the age of seventy-two. His only direct followers were his sons Muzio (1619–1676) and Bernardino (d. 1703). Pier Francesco Mola (1612–1666) apprenticed in his studio. Other pupils include Francesco Allegrini da Gubbio, Guido Ubaldo Abatini, Vincenzo Manenti, and Bernardino Parasole. His most notable and perhaps surprising pupil, however, was Caravaggio.

== Critical assessment ==
Cesari was stigmatized by Luigi Lanzi, as not less the corrupter of taste in painting than Marino was in poetry (Lanzi disdained the style of post-Michelangelo Mannerism as a time of decline). Only recently his work has been critically reappraised.

== Selected works ==
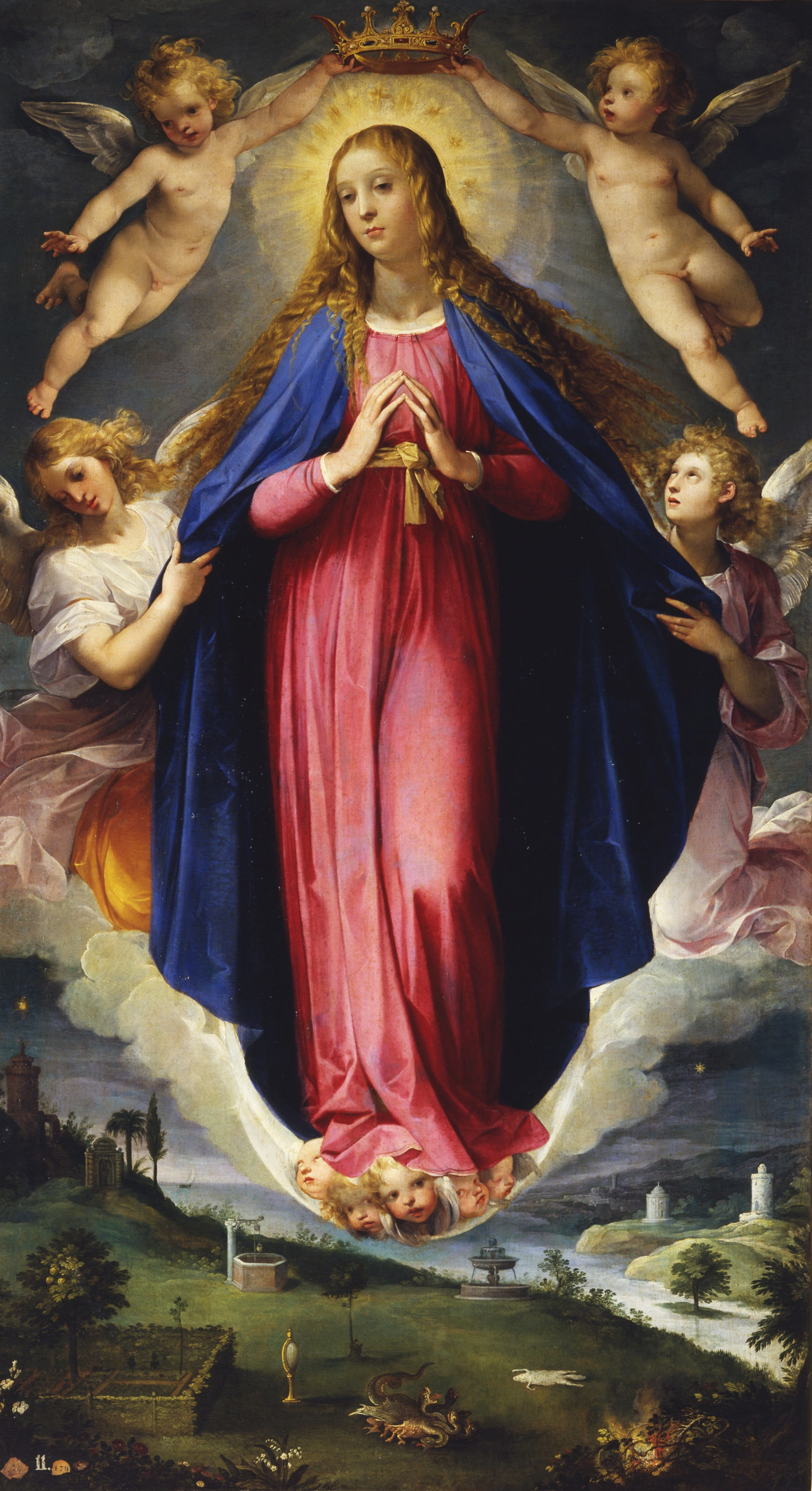
Immaculate Conception, Real Academia de Bellas Artes de San Fernando, Madrid

- Cappella Olgiati in Santa Prassede (1592);
- Frescoes in Salon of the Palazzo dei Conservatori (now Capitoline Museum, 1595–96):
  - Battle between Horatii and Curiatii;
  - Finding of the She-wolf;
  - Rape of the Sabine Women;
  - Numa Pompilius Instituting the Cult of the Vestals.
- Cappella Paolina in the church of Santa Maria Maggiore (1609);
- Immaculate Conception, Real Academia de Bellas Artes de San Fernando, Madrid;
- Prado Museum, Madrid:
  - The Holy Family with the Infant Saint John;
  - The Mystical Betrothal of Saint Catherine.
- Perseus Rescuing Andromeda, Saint Louis Art Museum, St. Louis;
- Archangel Michael and the Rebel Angels, Kelvingrove Art Gallery and Museum, Glasgow;
- The Agony in the Garden, National Museum Cardiff;
- The Transfiguration, Ferens Art Gallery, Kingston upon Hull;
- Perseus Freeing Andromeda, Gemäldegalerie, Berlin;
- Diana and Actaeon, Paris, Louvre;
- Immaculate Conception, Royal Academy of Fine Arts of San Fernando, Madrid;
- St. Clare with the Scene of the Siege of Assisi, Hermitage Museum, Saint Petersburg;
- St. Lawrence among the Poor and Sick, Barber Institute of Fine Arts, Birmingham.
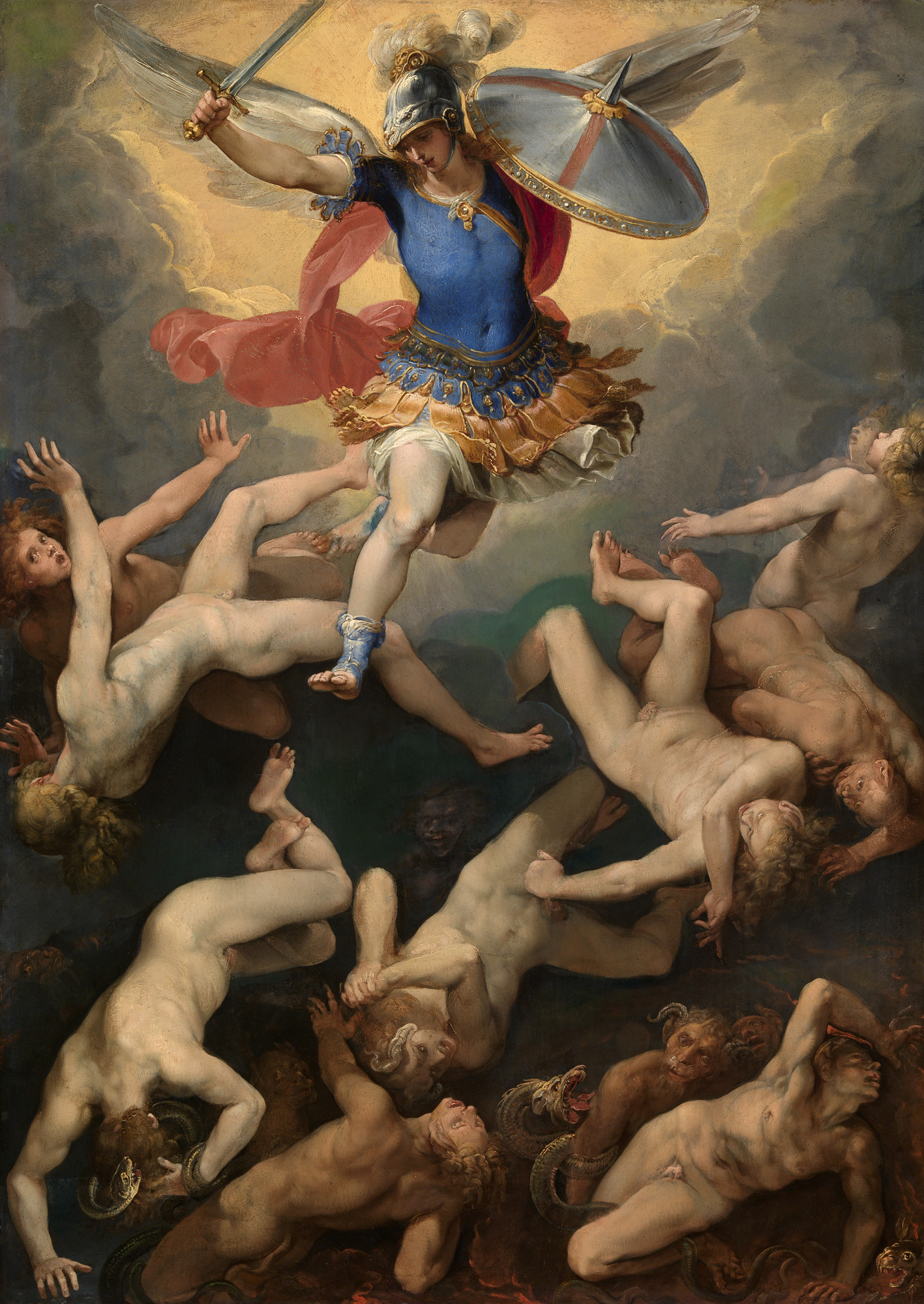
Archangel Michael and the Rebel Angels, c. 1592–1593, Kelvingrove Art Gallery and Museum, Glasgow

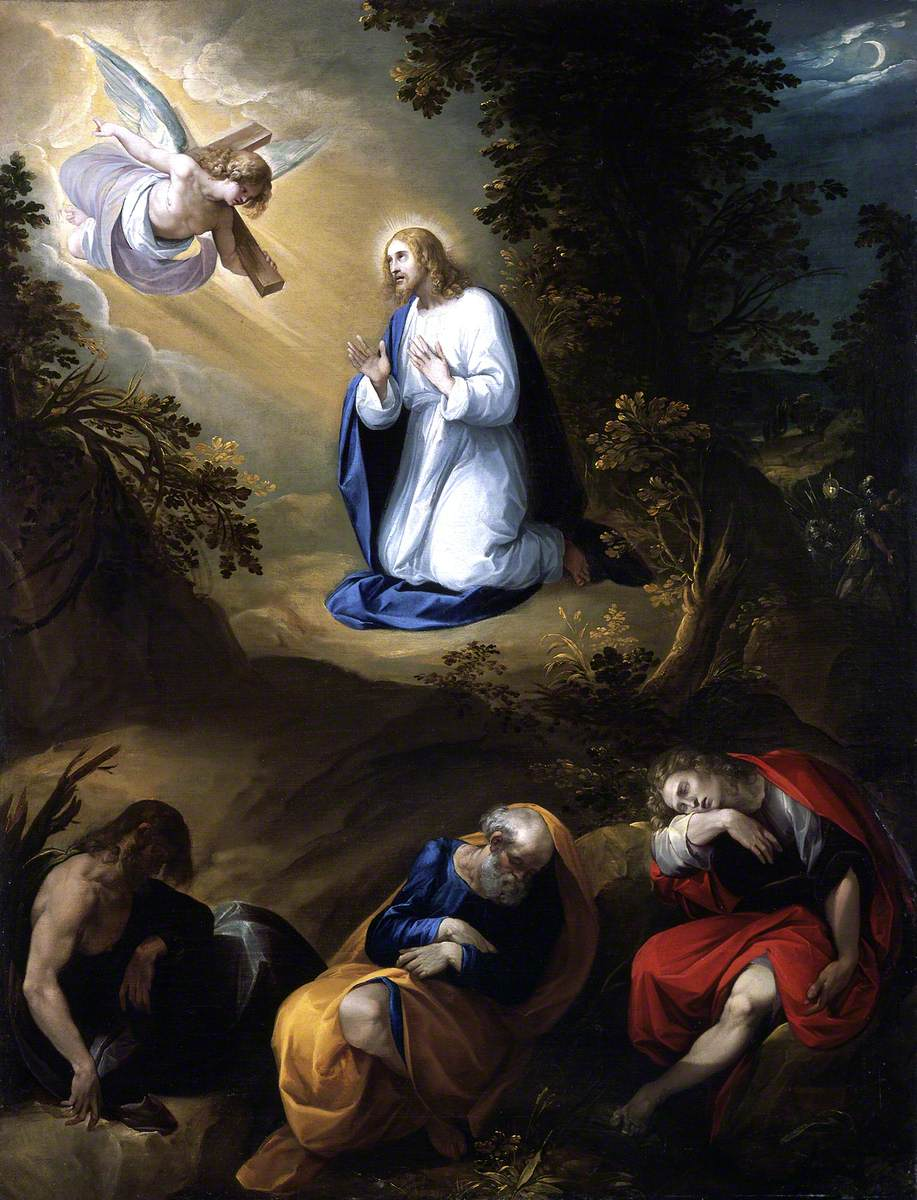
The Agony in the Garden, c. 1600, National Museum Cardiff

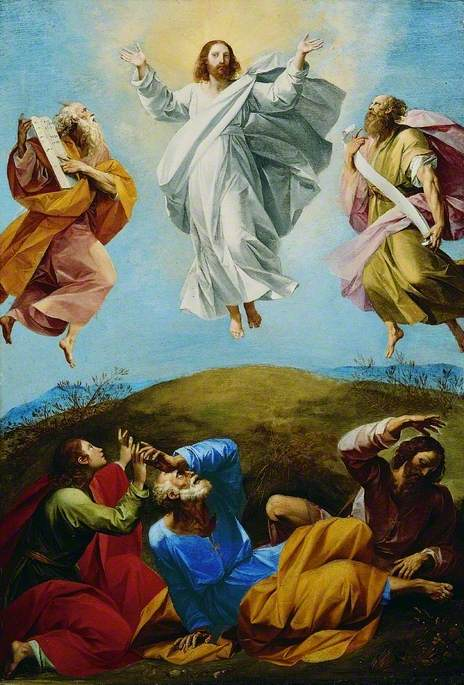
The Transfiguration, c. 1620, Ferens Art Gallery, Kingston upon Hull

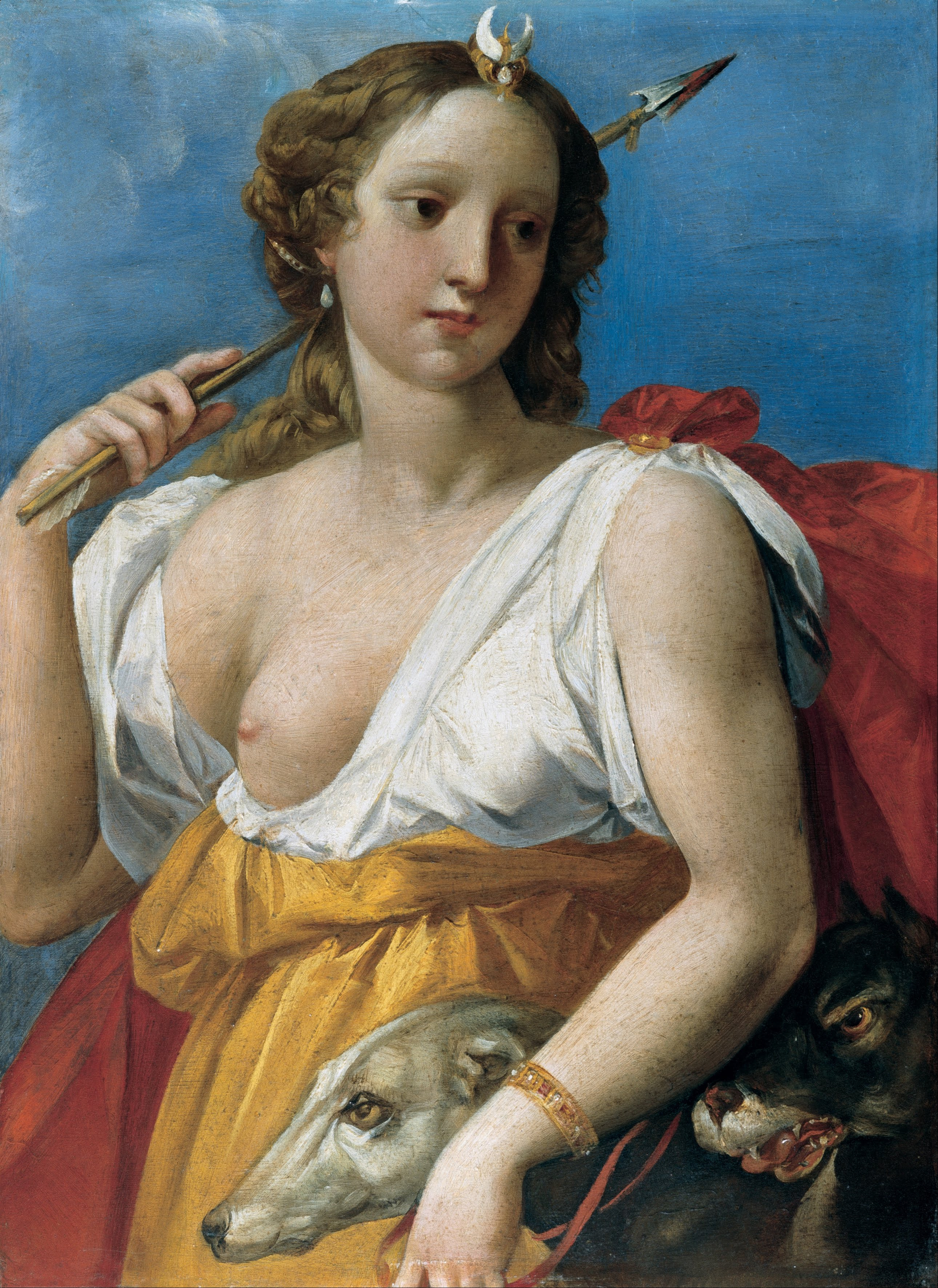
Diane the Huntress (1601-1603), Capitoline Museums, Rome

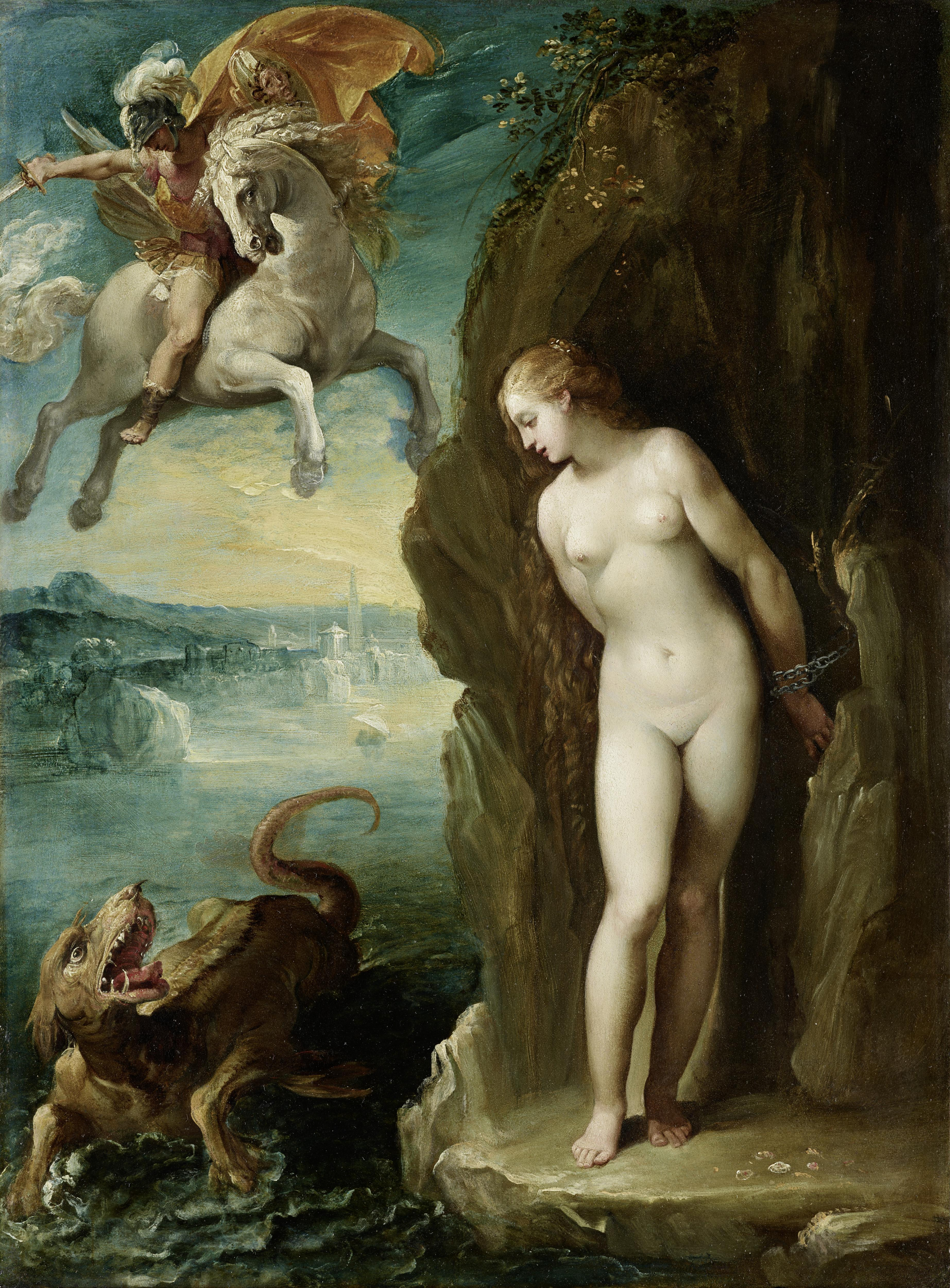
Perseus Freeing Andromeda, c. 1598, Gemäldegalerie, Berlin

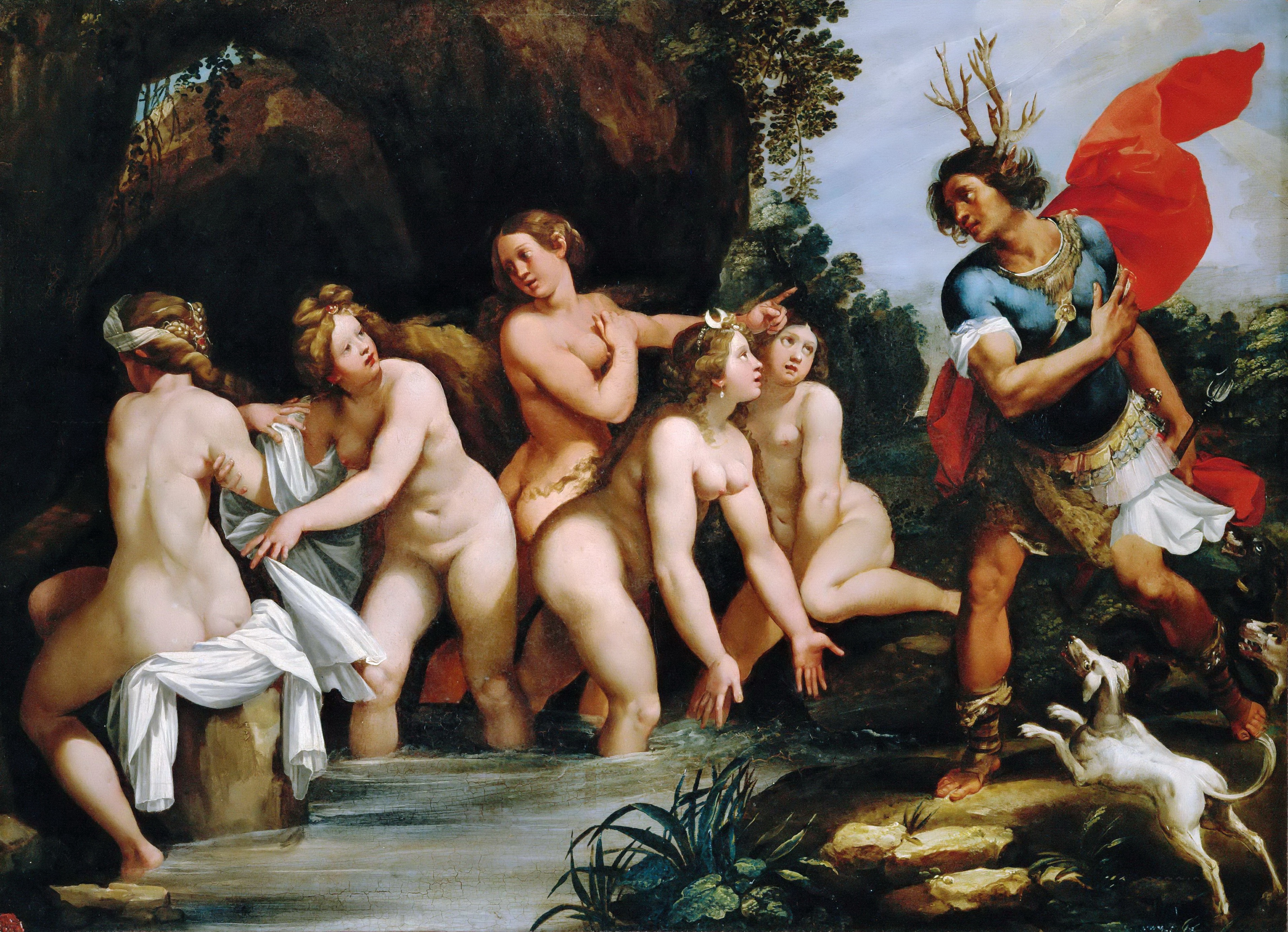
Diana and Actaeon c. 1602-1603, Paris, Louvre
