= 1690 =

1690 in various calendars
- Gregorian calendar: 1690; MDCXC
- Ab urbe condita: 2443
- Armenian calendar: 1139; ԹՎ ՌՃԼԹ
- Assyrian calendar: 6440
- Balinese saka calendar: 1611–1612
- Bengali calendar: 1096–1097
- Berber calendar: 2640
- English Regnal year: 2 Will. & Mar. – 3 Will. & Mar.
- Buddhist calendar: 2234
- Burmese calendar: 1052
- Byzantine calendar: 7198–7199
- Chinese calendar: 己巳年 (Earth Snake); 4387 or 4180 — to — 庚午年 (Metal Horse); 4388 or 4181
- Coptic calendar: 1406–1407
- Discordian calendar: 2856
- Ethiopian calendar: 1682–1683
- Hebrew calendar: 5450–5451
- Hindu calendars
- Vikram Samvat: 1746–1747
- Shaka Samvat: 1611–1612
- Kali Yuga: 4790–4791
- Holocene calendar: 11690
- Igbo calendar: 690–691
- Iranian calendar: 1068–1069
- Islamic calendar: 1101–1102
- Japanese calendar: Genroku 3 (元禄３年)
- Javanese calendar: 1613–1614
- Julian calendar: Gregorian minus 10 days
- Korean calendar: 4023
- Minguo calendar: 222 before ROC 民前222年
- Nanakshahi calendar: 222
- Thai solar calendar: 2232–2233
- Tibetan calendar: ས་མོ་སྦྲུལ་ལོ་ (female Earth-Snake); 1816 or 1435 or 663 — to — ལྕགས་ཕོ་རྟ་ལོ་ (male Iron-Horse); 1817 or 1436 or 664

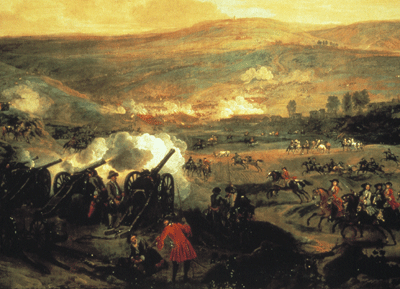
July 11: English King William III defeats former King James II at the Battle of the Boyne.

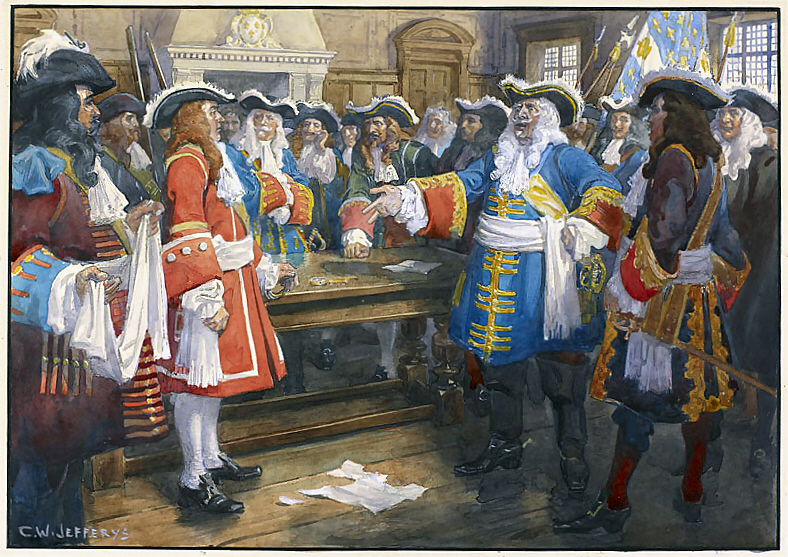
October 16: British Canadian envoys demand that Governor-General Frontenac surrender New France (now Quebec) or face an invasion.

1690 (MDCXC) was a common year starting on Sunday of the Gregorian calendar and a common year starting on Wednesday of the Julian calendar, the 1690th year of the Common Era (CE) and Anno Domini (AD) designations, the 690th year of the 2nd millennium, the 90th year of the 17th century, and the 1st year of the 1690s decade. As of the start of 1690, the Gregorian calendar was 10 days ahead of the Julian calendar, which remained in localized use until 1923.

== Events ==
=== January–March ===
- January 2 – The Ottoman Empire defeats Serbian rebels and Austrian troops in battle at Kaçanik Gorge, prompting more than 30,000 Serb refugees to flee northward from Kosovo, Macedonia and Sandžak to the Austrian Empire.
- January 6 – At the age of 11 years old, Prince Joseph, son of Leopold I, Holy Roman Emperor, is named as "King of the Romans", the next in line to become the Emperor.
- January 7 – The first recorded full peal is rung, at St Sepulchre-without-Newgate in the City of London, marking a new era in change ringing.
- January 13 – Captain Thomas Pound, after being captured with his crew the previous month, is tried in Boston and found guilty of piracy although he is later reprieved.
- January 27
  - The crew of the ship HMS Welfare, commanded by John Strong, become the first European people to land at the Falkland Islands.
  - William Coward is hanged for acts of piracy, following his capture after seizing the ketch Elenor anchored in Boston Harbor the previous year.
  - The Convention Parliament is dissolved in England.
- February 6 – King William III of England calls for new elections for the 512-member House of Commons
- February 8 – The Schenectady massacre takes place in the village of Schenectady in the colony of New York, when 200 Frenchmen, Mohawk and Algonquin warriors kill or capture most of the inhabitants in retaliation for the Lachine massacre.
- February 21 – The opera Orphée by Louis Lully receives its first performance at the Académie Royale de Musique (the Paris Opera).
- March 10 – An annular solar eclipse is visible across the south of the Pacific Ocean.
- March 20 – The 2nd Parliament of William III and Mary II is assembled in London, split almost equally with 243 Whigs, 241 Tories, and 28 independent members.

=== April–June ===
- April 6 – Leopold I, Holy Roman Emperor issues a document inviting Serbians to resettle in Hungary, at this time a part of the Empire.
- April 16 – An estimated 8.0 magnitude earthquake strikes in the Caribbean Sea less than 10 miles (16 km) from Barbuda and also affects St. Kitts and Nevis, as well as Antigua.
- April 25 – The Parliament of Scotland passes an Act to abolish episcopy in the presbyterian Church of Scotland. The Anglican Episcopal Church in Scotland continues as a separate denomination, retaining bishops.
- April 27 – Sultan Toloko ibn-Sibori becomes the new Sultan of Ternate, located on the Maluku Islands in the Dutch East Indies after the death of his father, Sultan Sibori Amsterdam.
- May 16 – The Battle of Port Royal takes place in Nova Scotia after an invasion by a militia of 446 soldiers and 226 sailors from the Massachusetts Bay Colony on seven warships. With only 90 French colonial soldiers to defend Port-Royal, Acadian Governor Louis-Alexandre des Friches de Menneval surrenders before the end of the day.
- May 20 – England passes the Act of Grace, forgiving followers of the deposed James II.
- June 8 – Siddi general Yadi Sakat razes the Mazagon Fort in Mumbai.
- June 14 – King William III of England (William of Orange) lands in Ireland to confront James II.
- June – An earthquake in Brazil of estimated magnitude 7, with epicenter on the left bank of the Amazon River about 45 km downstream from Manaus, spreads seismic waves through the forest and is felt up to 1000 km away.

=== July–September ===
- July 10 (June 30 O.S.) – Battle of Beachy Head: the Anglo-Dutch navy is defeated by the French, giving rise to fears of a Jacobite invasion of England.
- July 11 (July 1 O.S.) – Battle of the Boyne in Ireland: King William III of England (William of Orange) defeats the deposed James II, who returns to exile in France. The rebellion in Ireland continues for a further year until the Orange army gains full control.
- July 26 – A French landing party raids and burns Teignmouth in Devon, England. However, with the loss of James II's position in Ireland, any plans for a real invasion are soon shelved, and Teignmouth is the last French attack on England.
- August 24 – In India, the fort and trading settlement of Sutanuti is founded on the Hooghly River by the English East India Company, following the signing of an Anglo-Mughal treaty.
- September 25 – The only issue of Publick Occurrences is published in Boston, Massachusetts, before being suppressed by the colonial authorities.

=== October–December ===
- October 6
  - Massachusetts Puritans, led by Sir William Phips, besiege the city of Quebec; the siege ends in failure after six days.
  - An earthquake with strength 5.2 occurs in Caernarfon, Wales, causing tremors that can be felt as far away as London and Dublin.
- October 8 – Great Turkish War: The Ottomans recapture Belgrade.
- October 16 – Lawrence Justinian (1381–1456) and John of Sahagún (c. 1430–79) are canonized by Pope Alexander VIII.
- October 21 – The play Amphitryon by John Dryden, based on Molière's 1668 play of the same name, receives its first performance at the Theatre Royal, Drury Lane, London.
- November 7 – The opera Énée et Lavinie (Aeneas and Lavinia) by the French composer Pascal Collasse receives its first performance at the Académie Royale de Musique (the Paris Opera).
- November 9 – Near South Mimms, England, several highwaymen stop a convoy carrying taxes from the Midlands to London and take £15,000.
- November 17 – Barclays, which will continue to be active into the 21st century as a multinational bank and lending institution, is founded in London by John Freame and Thomas Gould as Freame & Gould. The bank changes its name in 1736 when James Barclay becomes a partner.
- December 4 – A destructive earthquake in the Eastern Alps causes 24 casualties and results in damage in the Villach, Carinthia area.
- December 10 –Playwright Henry Nevil Payne is tortured for his role in the Montgomery Plot to restore James II to the throne — the last time a political prisoner is legally subjected to torture in Britain.
- December 13 – The planet Uranus is first sighted and recorded, by England's first Astronomer Royal, John Flamsteed, who mistakenly catalogs it as a star 34 Tauri.
- December 20 (December 10, 1690 O.S.) — The General Court of the Province of Massachusetts Bay creates the first authorized paper money issued by any government in the Western World as a substitute for coins. The first money is printed on February 13, 1691 (N.S.) and is dated "Feb. 3, 1690" based on the British old style calendar in use at the time.
- December 29 – An earthquake hits Ancona, in the Papal States of Italy and causes 10 deaths.

=== Date unknown ===
- Serbian Patriarch Arsenije III Crnojević leads the first of the two Great Serbian Migrations into the Habsburg Empire, following Ottoman atrocities in Kosovo.
- The Hearth Tax is abolished in Scotland, one year after its abolition in England and Wales.
- French physicist Denis Papin, while in Leipzig and having observed the mechanical power of atmospheric pressure on his 'digester', builds a working model of a reciprocating steam engine for pumping water, the first of its kind, though not efficient.
- Dutch polymath Christiaan Huygens publishes his book Treatise on Light. The book is considered a pioneering work of theoretical and mathematical physics.
- Giovanni Domenico Cassini observes differential rotation within Jupiter's atmosphere.
- The construction of Fort Longueuil, a stone fort in Longueuil, in Quebec, Canada, is completed. It is one of the only buildings in Canada that could ever be considered a castle (fortified residence for a noble), and out of those buildings it most resembles the castles of Europe.
- The Barrage Vauban, a defensive work in the city of Strasbourg (in modern-day France), is completed.
- The French dictionary and encyclopaedia Dictionnaire universel, contenant generalement tous les mots françois, compiled by Antoine Furetière, is published posthumously.
- Possible year of the disappearance of the western part of the island of Buise, in St. Peter's Flood.

== Births ==
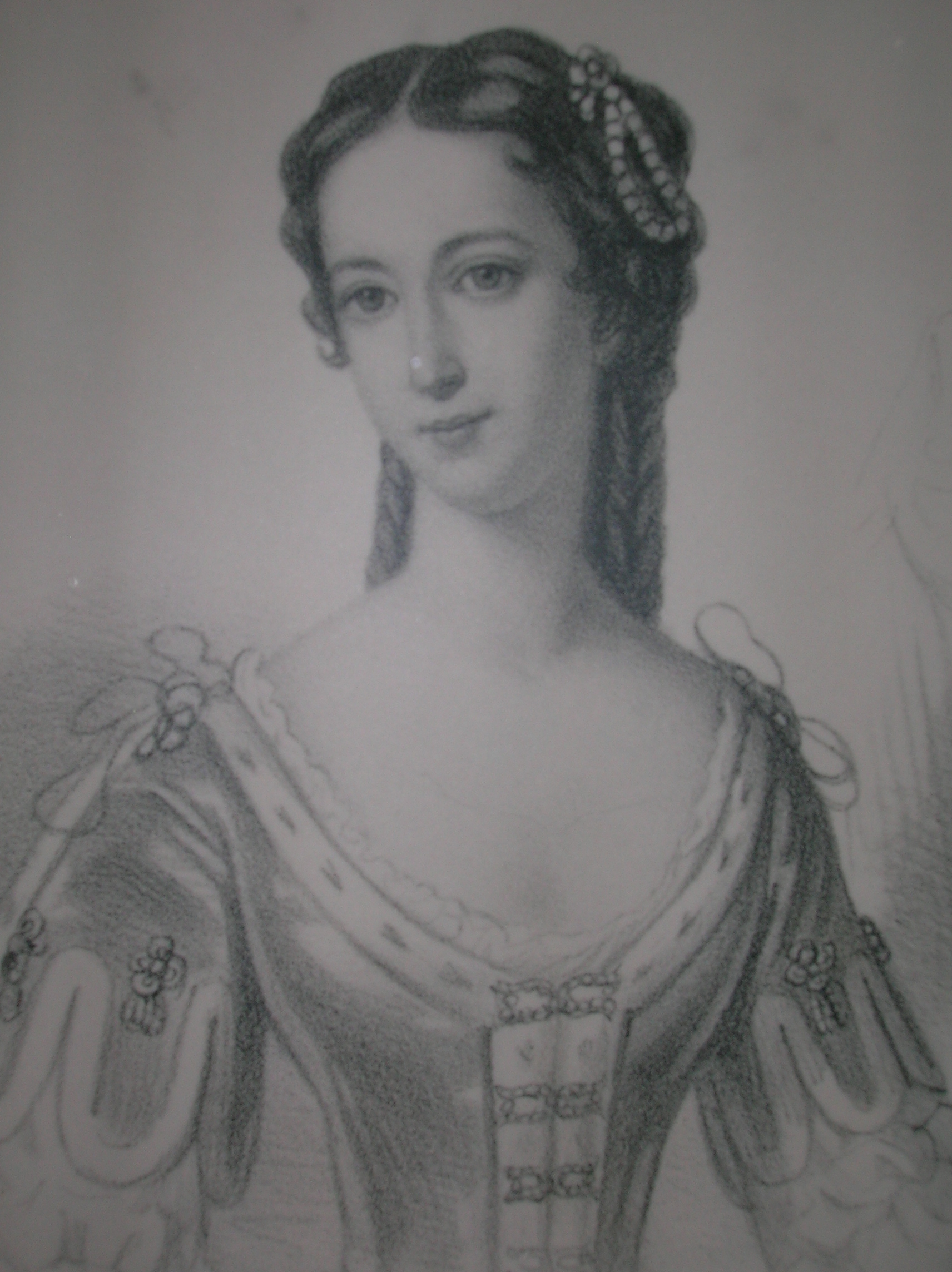
Susanna Montgomerie, Countess of Eglinton born 1 January

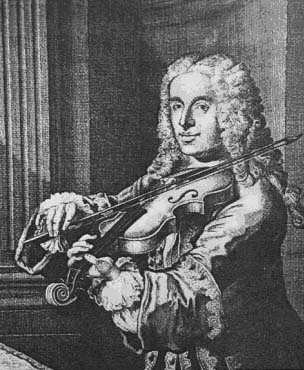
Francesco Maria Veracini born 1 February

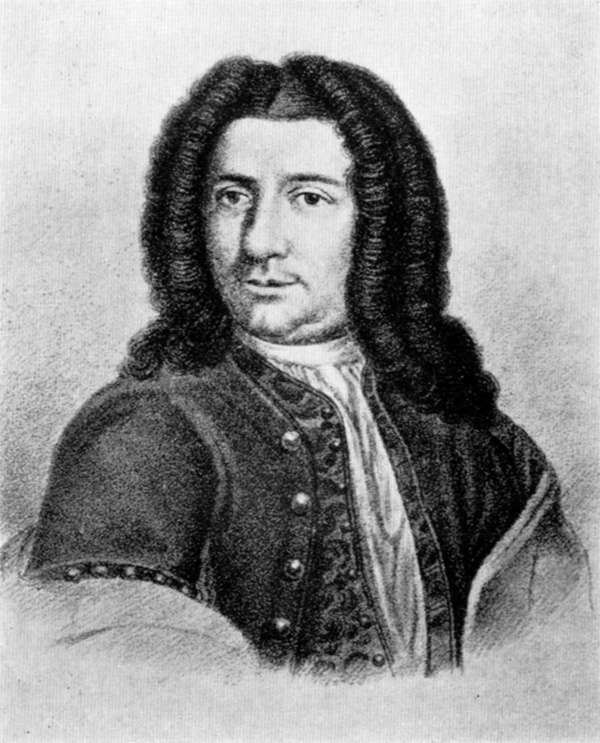
Kilian Stobæus born 6 February

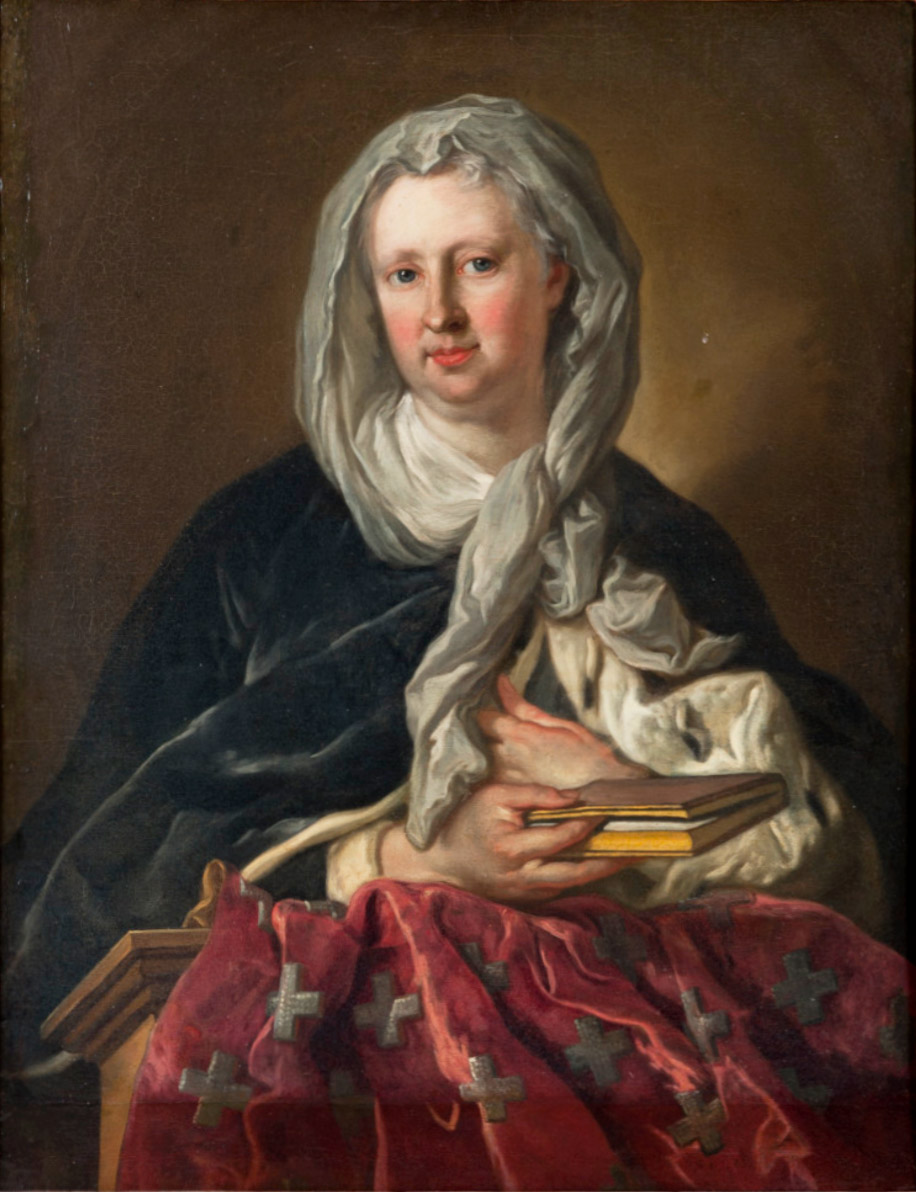
Maria Vittoria of Savoy born 9 February

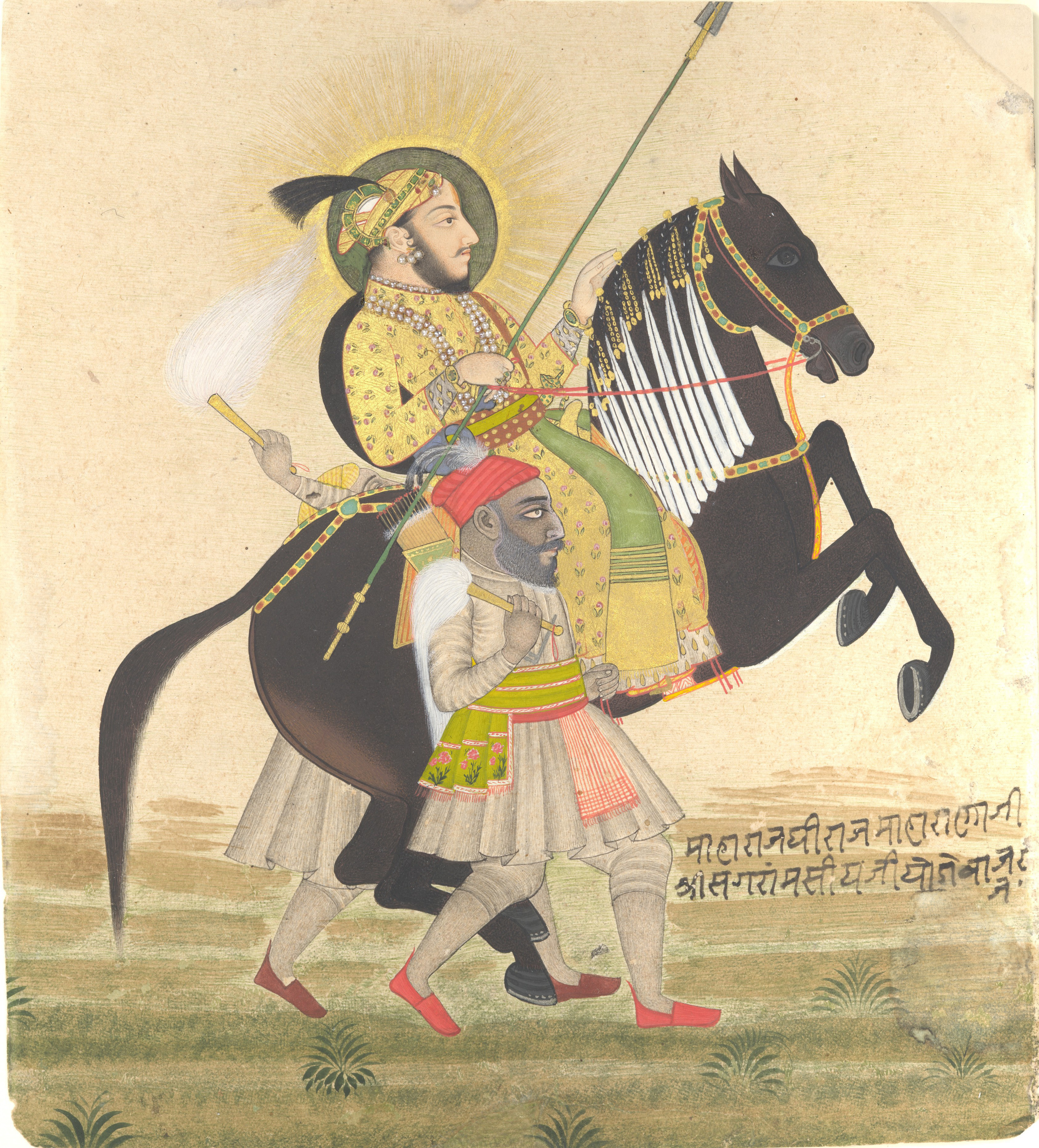
Sangram Singh II born 24 March

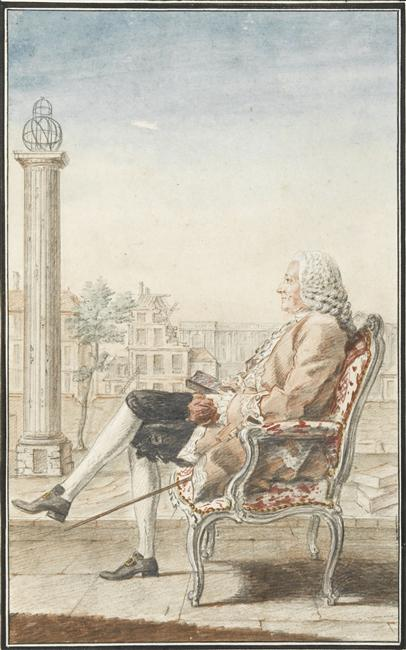
Louis Petit de Bachaumont born 2 June

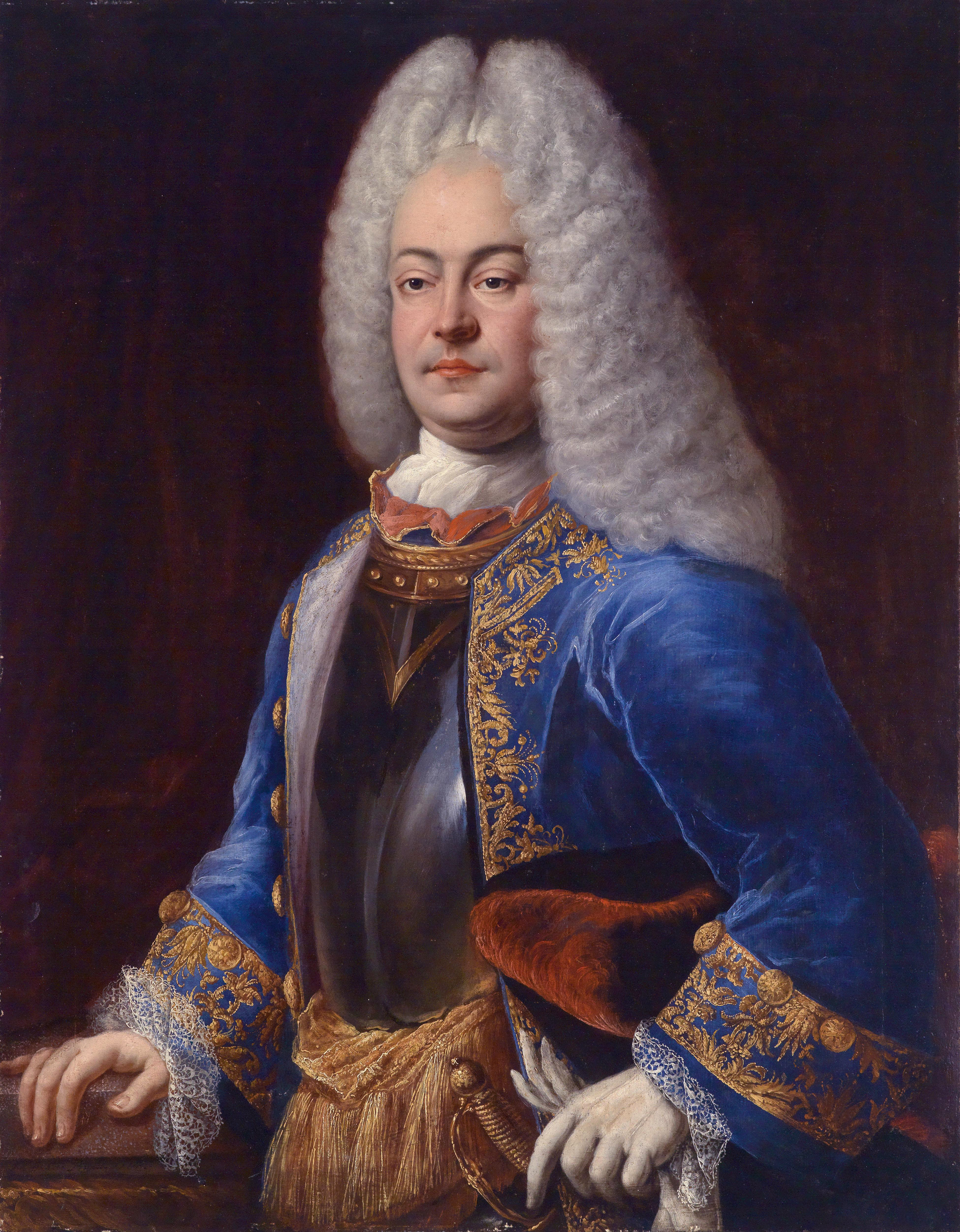
George Albert, Prince of East Frisia born 13 June

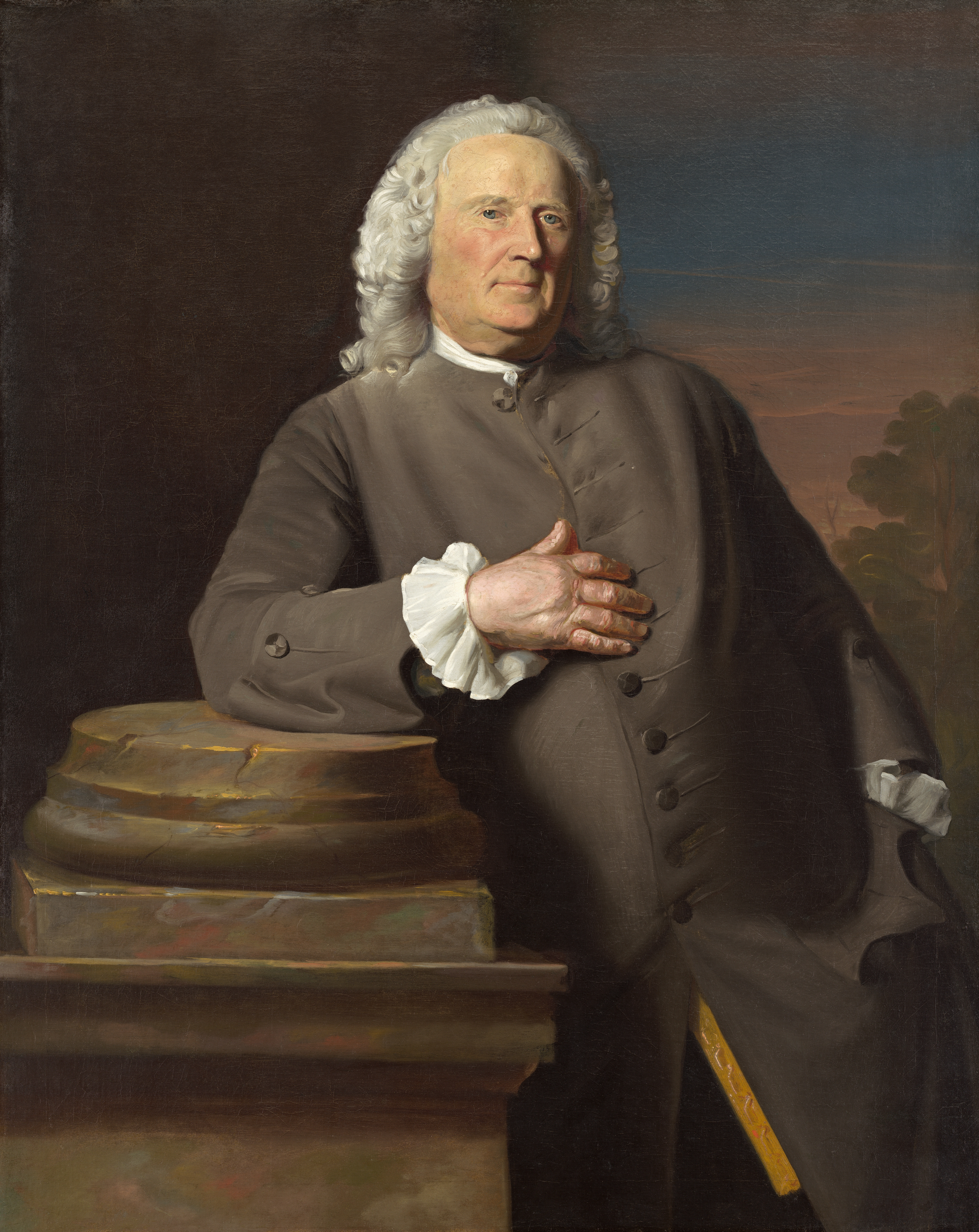
Epes Sargent (soldier) born 12 July

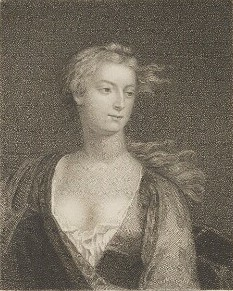
Martha Blount born 15 October

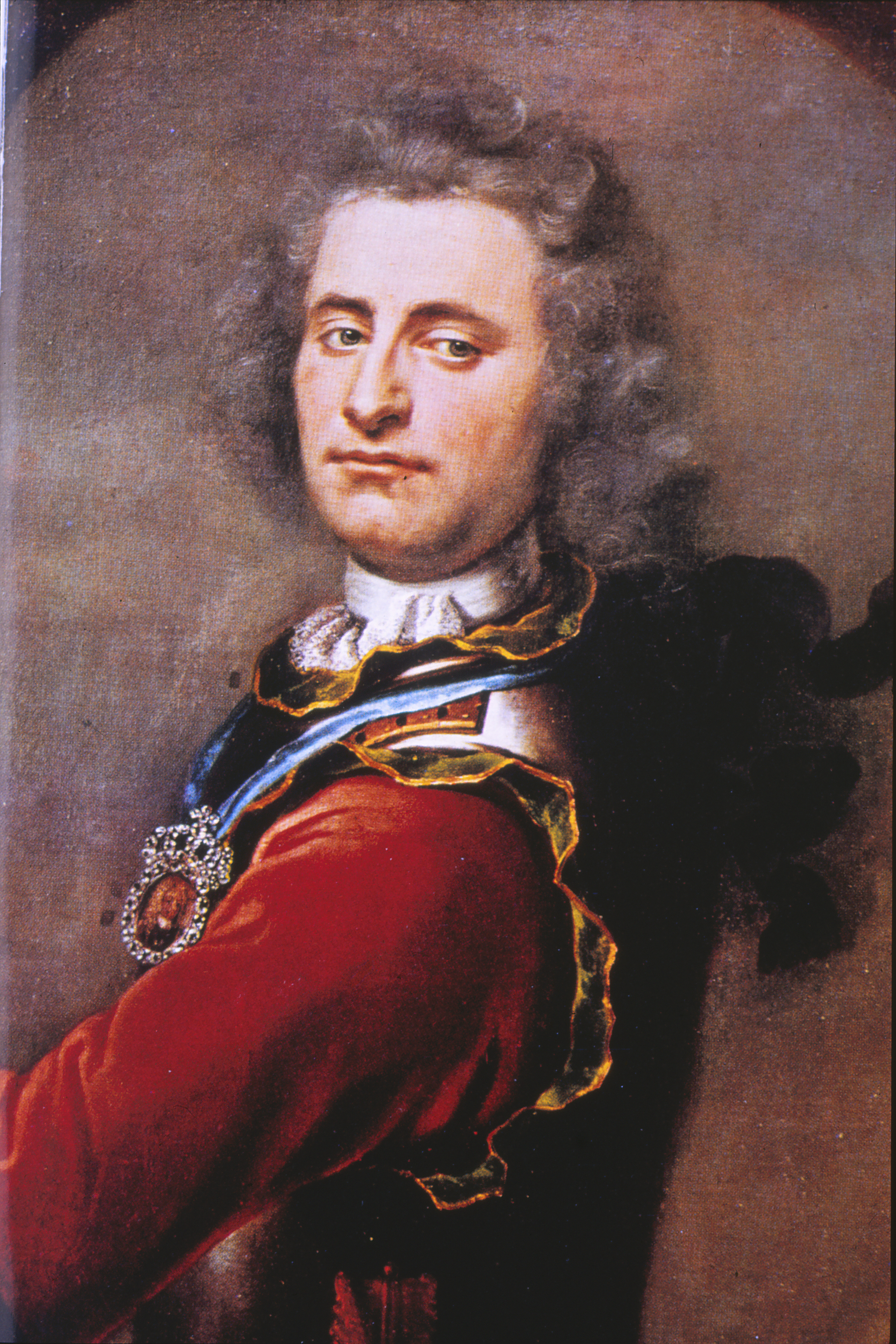
Peter Tordenskjold born 28 October

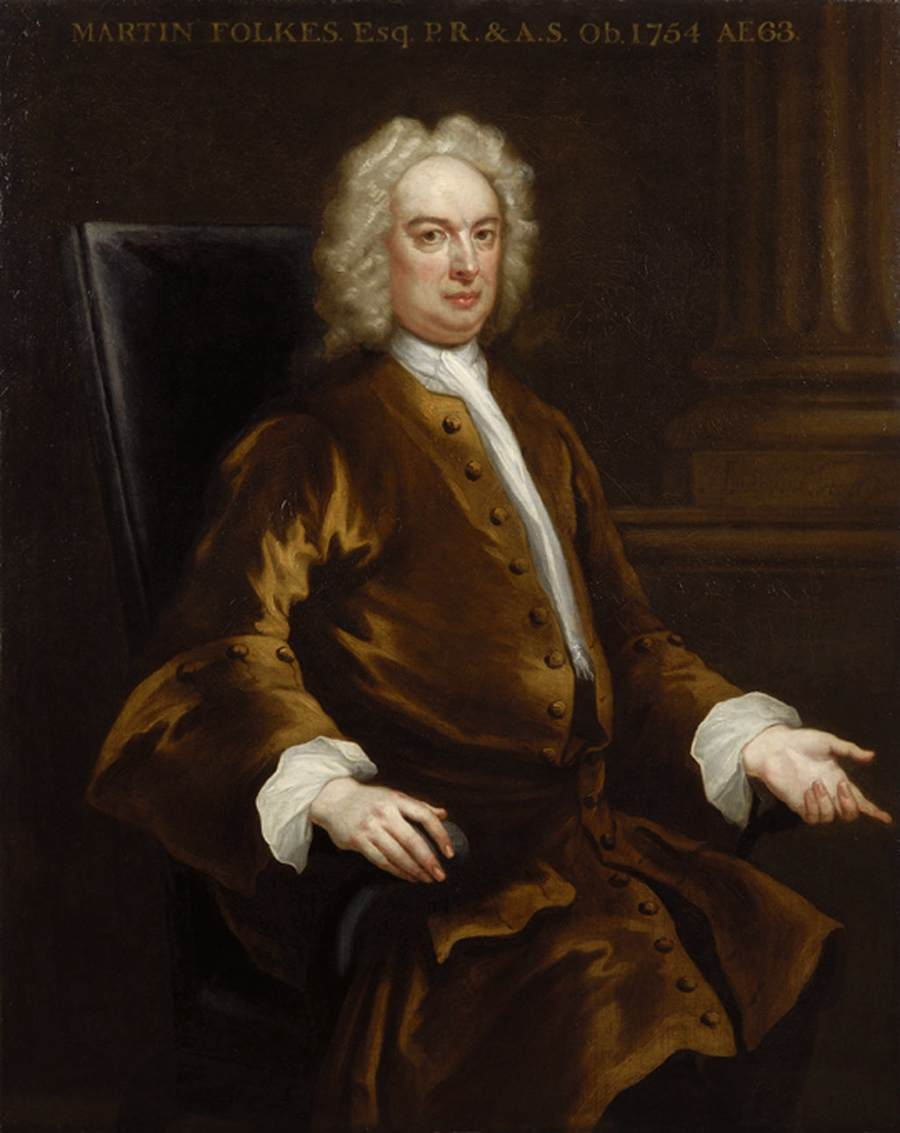
Martin Folkes born 29 October

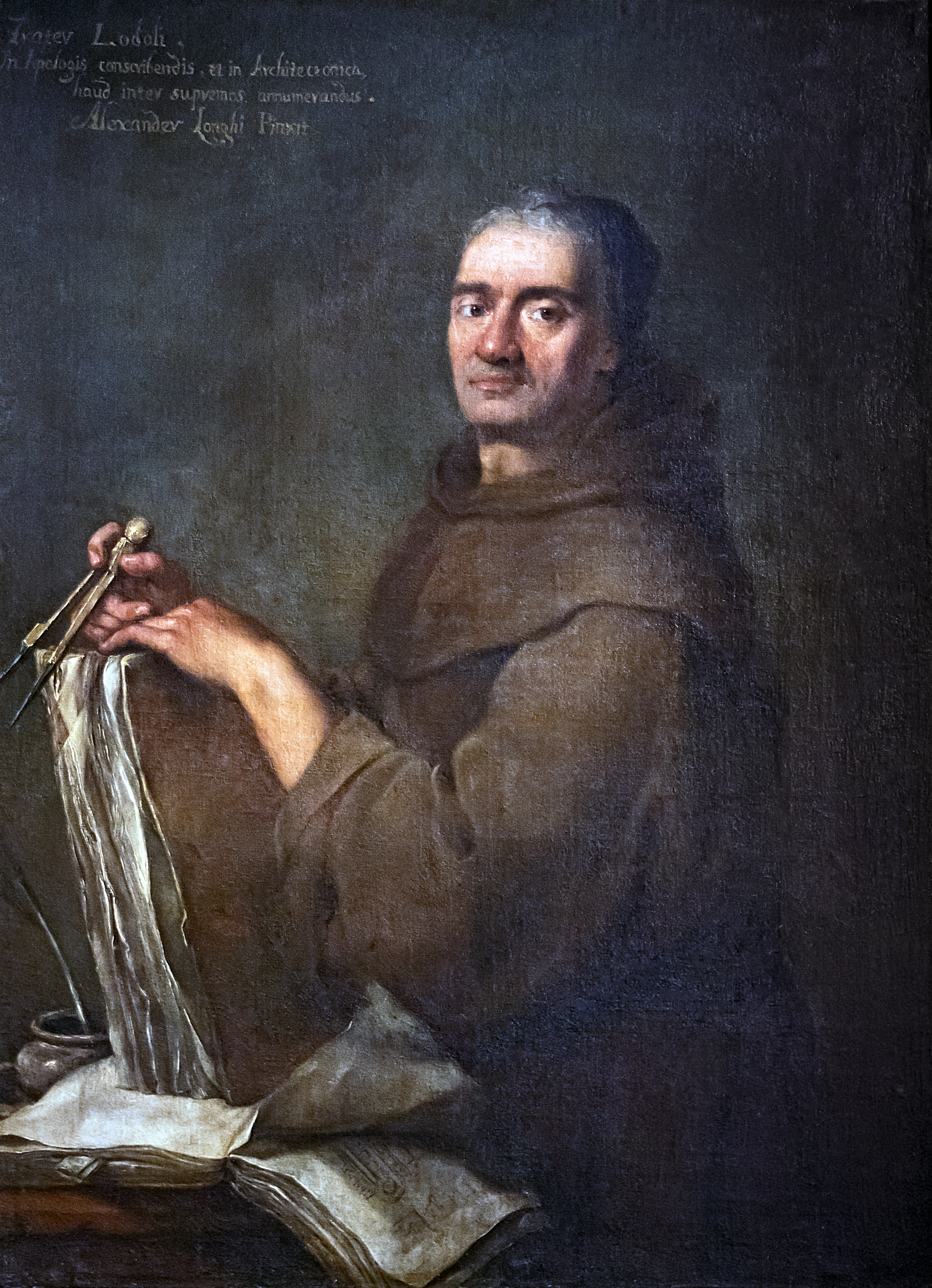
Carlo Lodoli born 28 November

=== January–March ===
- March 3 – Gilbert Livingston (d. 1746)
- January 1
  - Christian Falster, Danish writer (d. 1752)
  - Susanna Montgomerie, Countess of Eglinton, Scottish literary patron and society hostess (d. 1780)
- January 10 – William Smelt, British Member of Parliament (d. 1755)
- January 13 – Gottfried Heinrich Stölzel, Spanish musician (d. 1749)
- January 14
  - Lorenzo Fratellini, Italian painter (d. 1729)
  - Chrysostomus Hanthaler, Austrian historian (d. 1754)
- January 16 – Juan Curiel, Spanish intellectual and politician (d. 1775)
- January 17 – Peter Schnitler, Danish/Norwegian jurist and military officer (d. 1757)
- January 19 – William Duncombe, British translator (d. 1769)
- January 22 – Nicolas Lancret, French painter (d. 1743)
- January 24
  - Phineas Bowles, British Army officer (d. 1749)
  - James Ward, Anglican priest in Ireland (d. 1736)
- January 25 – Jean-Paul de Rome d'Ardène, French botanist, agronomist and priest (d. 1769)
- January 28 – Corbet Kynaston, British Member of Parliament (d. 1740)
- February 1 – Francesco Maria Veracini, Italian composer (d. 1768)
- February 3 – Richard Rawlinson, English minister, antiquarian (d. 1755)
- February 5 – Johann Daniel Schumacher, Russian scholar (d. 1761)
- February 6
  - Giovanni Battista Maini, Italian artist (d. 1752)
  - Kilian Stobæus, Swedish physician (d. 1742)
- February 7 – Charles Frederick II, Duke of Württemberg-Oels (d. 1761)
- February 9 – Maria Vittoria of Savoy, Italian princess (d. 1766)
- February 11 – Sir William Blackett, 2nd Baronet, British politician (d. 1728)
- February 14 – Jakob Ernst von Liechtenstein-Kastelkorn, Austrian archbishop (d. 1747)
- February 17
  - Marcello Papiniano Cusani, Italian archbishop (d. 1766)
  - Samuel Phillips, American clergyman (d. 1771)
- February 22 – Daniele Farlati, Italian Jesuit and historian (d. 1773)
- February 26 – Samuel van der Putte, Dutch traveler and explorer (d. 1745)
- February 28 – Alexei Petrovich, Tsarevich of Russia, Russian Tsarevich (d. 1718)
- March 1
  - Silvio Valenti Gonzaga, Catholic cardinal (d. 1756)
  - Victor Amadeus I, Prince of Carignano, Italian nobleman (d. 1741)
- March 10 – Johann Jakob Schmauss, German jurist (d. 1757)
- March 12 – George Lee, 2nd Earl of Lichfield, British peer (d. 1743)
- March 16 – Benjamin Elbel, German theologian (d. 1756)
- March 18 – Christian Goldbach, Prussian mathematician (d. 1764)
- March 23 – Casimir William of Hesse-Homburg, Prince of Hesse-Homburg (d. 1726)
- March 24 – Sangram Singh II, Maharana of Mewar (d. 1734)
- March 29 – John Montagu, 2nd Duke of Montagu, British duke (d. 1749)

=== April–June ===
- April 2 – Angelo Piò, Italian sculptor (d. 1769)
- April 8 – Domenico Maria Manni, Italian historian (d. 1788)
- April 9 – Johan Henrik Scheffel, Swedish artist (d. 1781)
- April 13 – Joachim Wagner, organ builder (d. 1749)
- April 14 – Jan Wandelaar, painter and engraver from the Northern Netherlands (d. 1759)
- April 15 – John Wallop, 1st Earl of Portsmouth, English politician and nobleman (d. 1762)
- April 20 – Giuseppe Gonzaga, Duke of Guastalla, Italian noble (d. 1746)
- April 22
  - John Carteret, 2nd Earl Granville, British statesman (d. 1763)
  - Robert Raikes the Elder, English printer (d. 1757)
- April 25 – Gottlieb Muffat, Austrian composer and organist (d. 1770)
- April 26 – Henri-Joseph Rega, physician and rector of the university of Leuven (d. 1754)
- May 1 – Luke Schaub, British diplomat (d. 1758)
- May 2 – Talbot Yelverton, 1st Earl of Sussex, British Earl (d. 1731)
- May 10 – Jean Moreau de Séchelles, French politician (d. 1761)
- May 14 – Jean Bouillet, French physician (d. 1777)
- May 25 – Joseph Johann Adam, Prince of Liechtenstein (d. 1732)
- May 30 – Anton Sturm, German sculptor (d. 1757)
- June 2 – Louis Petit de Bachaumont, French writer (d. 1771)
- June 3 – François de Pâris, Catholic priest and theologian (d. 1727)
- June 9 – Michel-Étienne Turgot, French lawyer (d. 1751)
- June 11 – Giovanni Antonio Giay, Italian composer (d. 1764)
- June 13 – George Albert, Prince of East Frisia (d. 1734)

=== July–September ===
- July 7 – Johann Tobias Krebs, German composer and organist (d. 1762)
- July 10 – Sir Henry Oxenden, 4th Baronet, British politician (d. 1720)
- July 12 – Epes Sargent, soldier (d. 1762)
- July 13 – Placidus Böcken, German lawyer (d. 1752)
- July 25 – Ferdinand von Plettenberg, German politician (d. 1737)
- August 3 – Jean Pâris de Monmartel, French private banker (d. 1766)
- September 4 – Polykarp Leyser IV, German academic (d. 1728)
- September 7 – Karl Heinrich von Bogatzky, German hymnwriter (d. 1774)
- September 8
  - Zachary Pearce, English bishop (d. 1774)
  - Lorenzo Zavateri, Italian baroque violinist (d. 1764)
- September 10 – Maeda Yoshinori, daimyo (d. 1745)
- September 12 – Peter Dens, Belgian Catholic theologian (d. 1775)
- September 15 – Ignazio Prota, Italian composer (d. 1748)
- September 18 – Charles Louis, Duke of Schleswig-Holstein-Sonderburg-Beck (d. 1774)
- September 23 – Giuseppe Bazzani, Italian painter (d. 1769)
- September 28
  - Jacques-Barthélemy Micheli du Crest, Genevan cartographer (d. 1766)
  - Michel Fourmont, French religious servant and professor (d. 1746)
  - James Murray, 2nd Duke of Atholl, British politician (d. 1764)

=== October–December ===
- October 9 – Robert Woodcock, English artist and composer (d. 1728)
- October 13 – Jean de Boullonges, French politician (d. 1769)
- October 14 – Léopold Philippe d'Arenberg, Austrian field marshal (d. 1754)
- October 15 – Martha Blount, friend of Alexander Pope (d. 1762)
- October 18 – Thomas Lewis, British politician (d. 1777)
- October 19 – Louis-Guillaume Verrier, Canadian lawyer (d. 1758)
- October 28 – Peter Tordenskjold, Norwegian sea officer (d. 1720)
- October 29 – Martin Folkes, English antiquary, numismatist, mathematician, astronomer (d. 1754)
- November 4 – Guillaume-Hyacinthe Bougeant, French Jesuit and writer (d. 1743)
- November 5
  - Carlo Giuseppe Merlo, Italian architect of the late-Baroque period (d. 1760)
  - Frederick Louis of Württemberg-Winnental, German army commander (d. 1734)
- November 7
  - Francisco Carriedo, General of Philippines (d. 1743)
  - Dominic Marquard, Prince of Löwenstein-Wertheim-Rochefort, German nobleman (d. 1735)
- November 10 – Christine Charlotte of Solms-Braunfels, Landgravine of Hesse-Homburg (d. 1771)
- November 13 – Ernst Johann von Biron, Duke of Courland and Semigallia (d. 1772)
- November 16 – John Brownlow, 1st Viscount Tyrconnel, Irish Viscount (d. 1754)
- November 17 – Noël-Nicolas Coypel, French painter (d. 1734)
- November 22 – François Colin de Blamont, French composer (d. 1760)
- November 24 (baptized) – Charles Theodore Pachelbel, German/American composer (d. 1750)
- November 28 – Carlo Lodoli, Italian architect (d. 1761)
- November 29 – Christian August, Prince of Anhalt-Zerbst, German general (d. 1747)
- December 1
  - Karl Philipp von Greifenclau zu Vollraths, German bishop (d. 1754)
  - Philip Yorke, 1st Earl of Hardwicke, English lawyer, politician, Lord Chancellor (d. 1764)
- December 2 – Robert Shafto, British politician (d. 1729)
- December 3 – José Maria da Fonseca e Évora, Franciscan friar and bishop, Portuguese Commissary General of the Franciscan Order (d. 1752)
- December 18 – Sir Edmund Isham, 6th Baronet, English baronet and Member of Parliament (d. 1772)
- December 22
  - Marie Anne Éléonore de Bourbon, French noble (d. 1760)
  - Meidingu Pamheiba, King of Manipur (d. 1751)
- December 25 – William Dicey (d. 1756)
- date unknown – Thomas Carter, Irish politician (d. 1763)

== Deaths ==
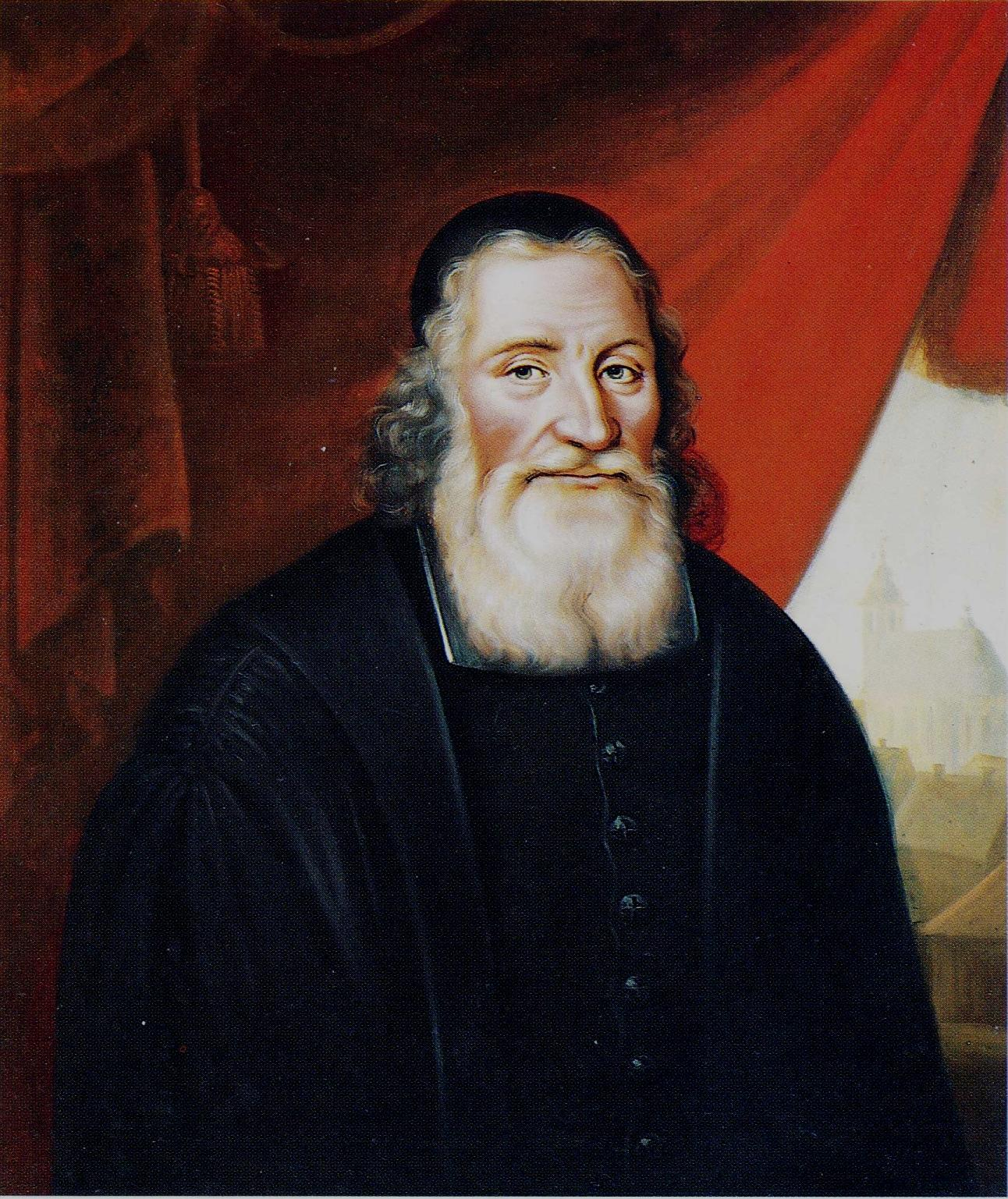
Johannes Gezelius the elder died 20 January

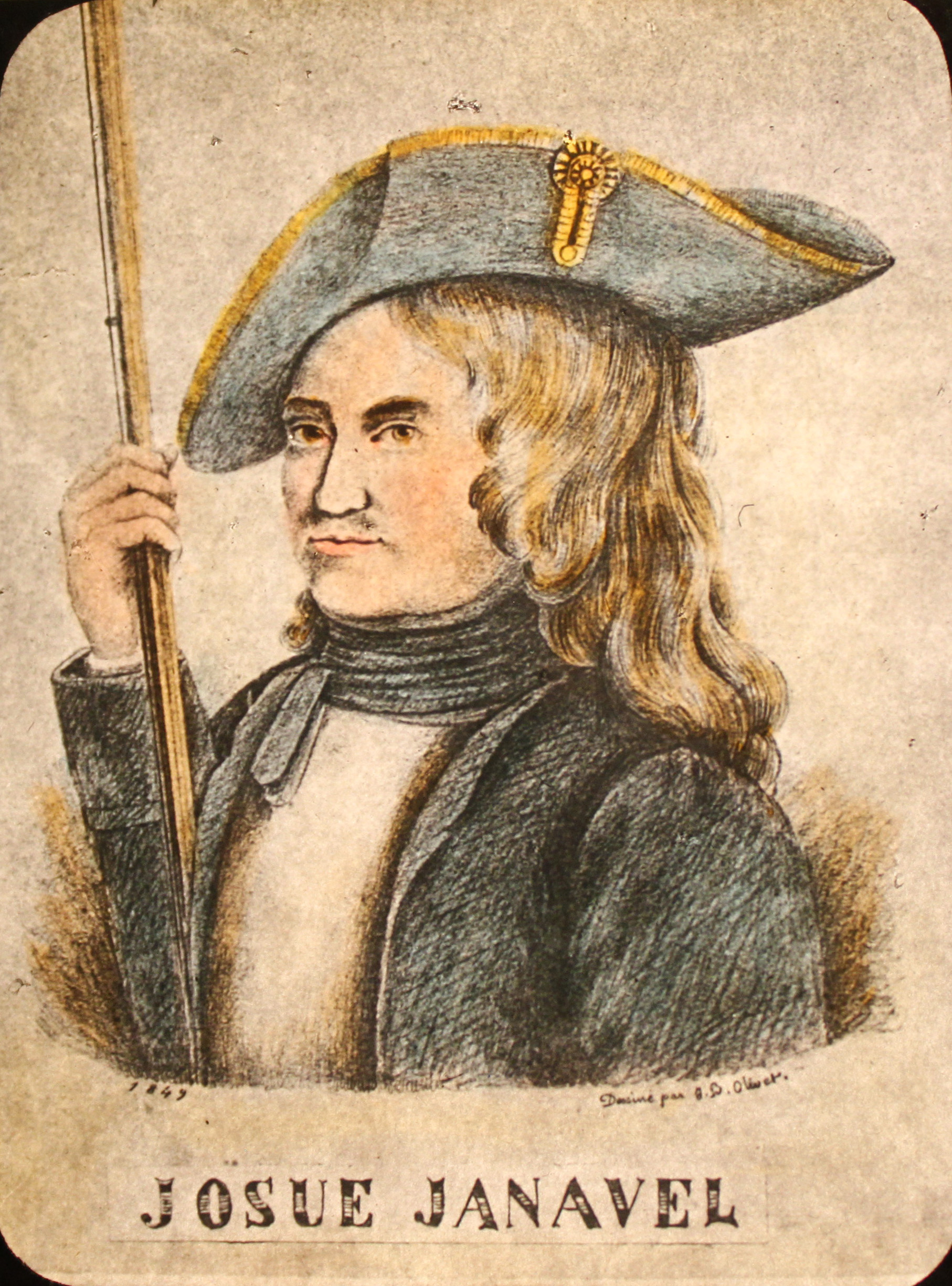
Joshua Janavel died 5 March

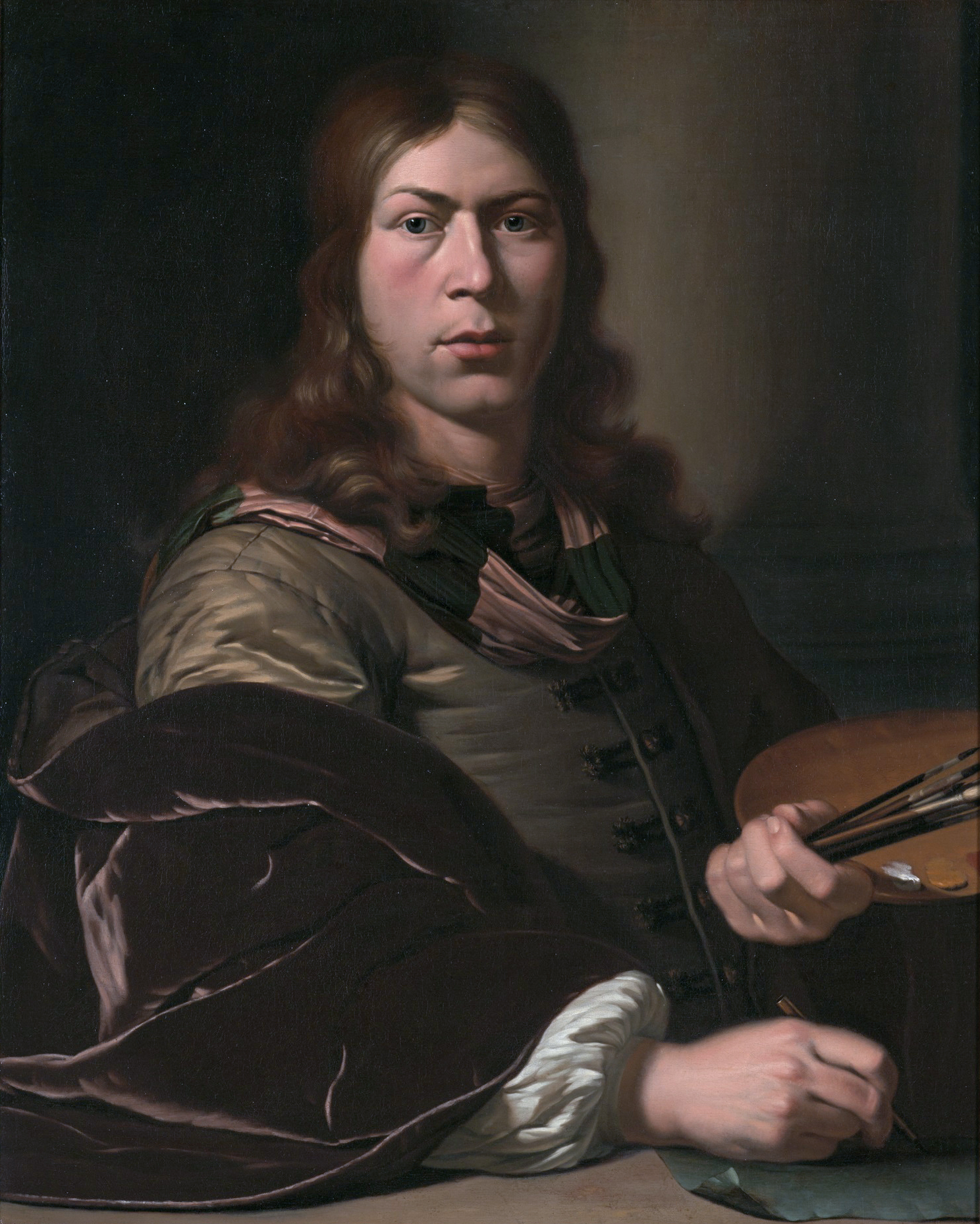
Jan van Mieris died 17 March

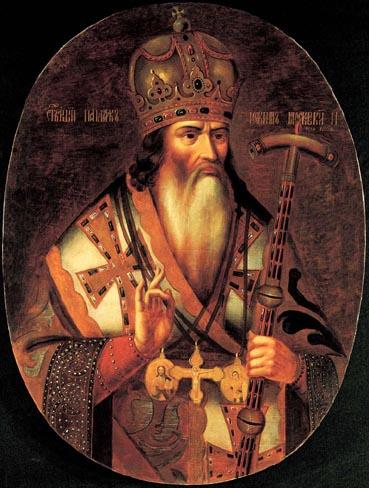
Patriarch Joachim of Moscow died 17 March

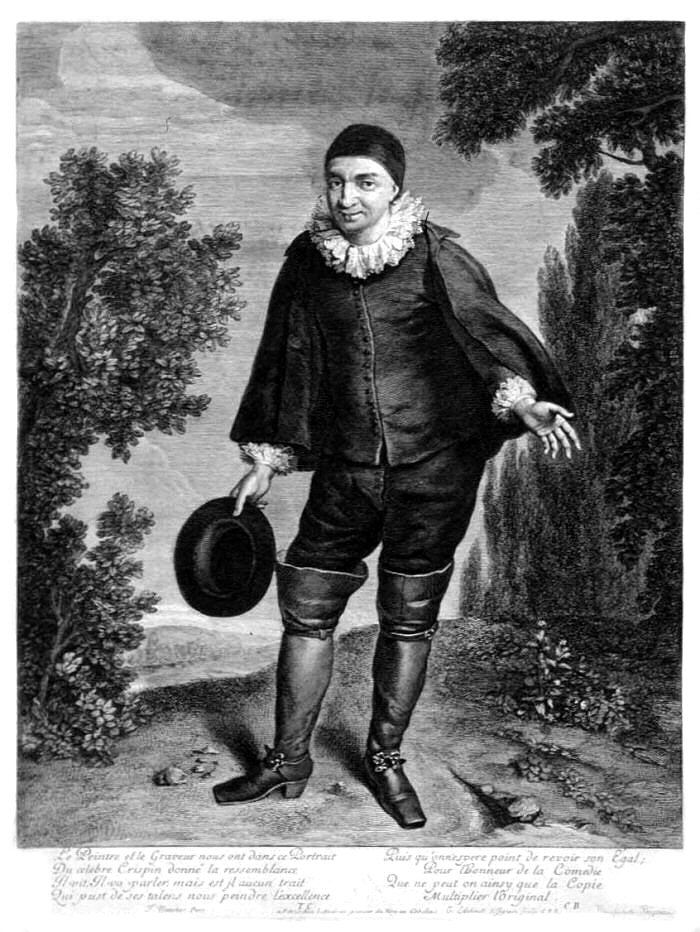
Raymond Poisson died 9 May

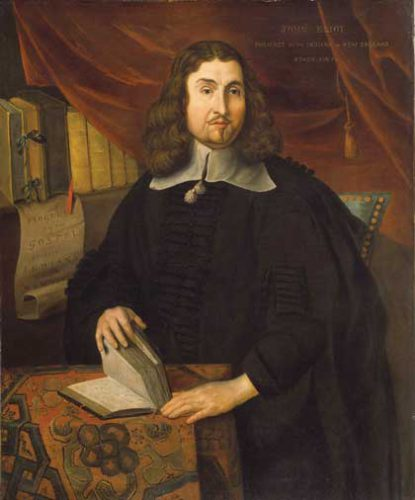
John Eliot (missionary) died 21 May

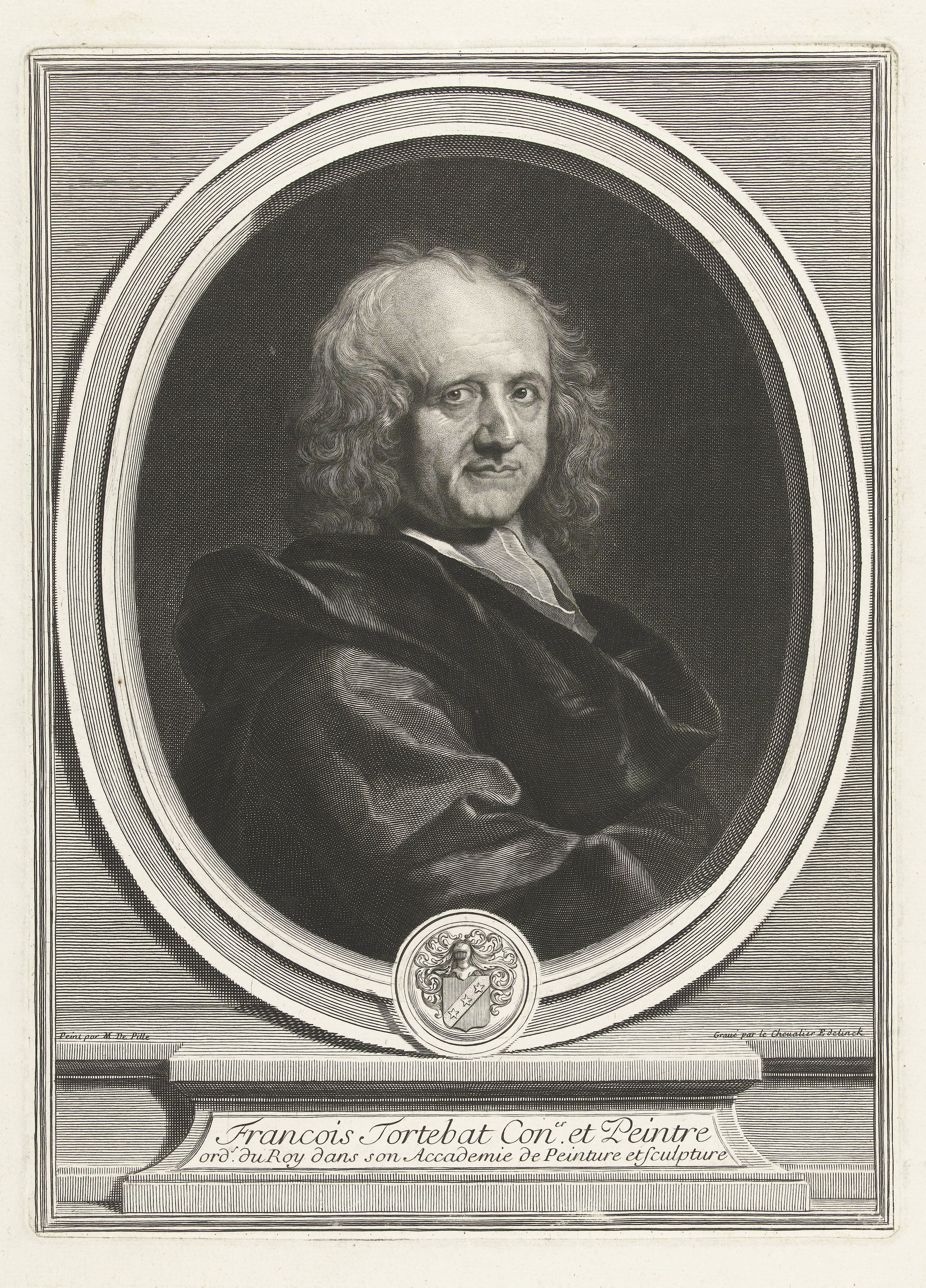
François Tortebat died 4 June

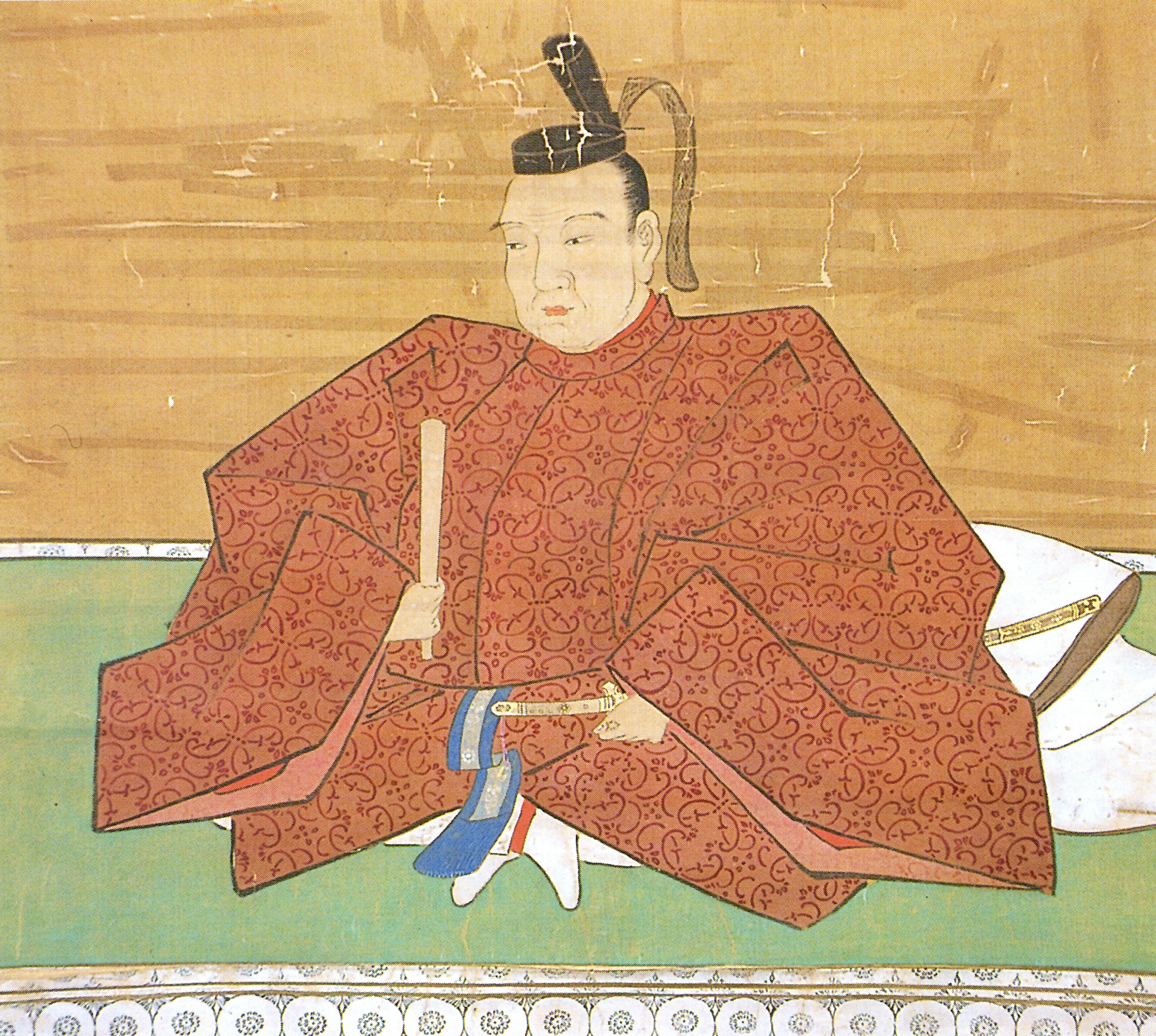
Hosokawa Yukitaka died 9 July

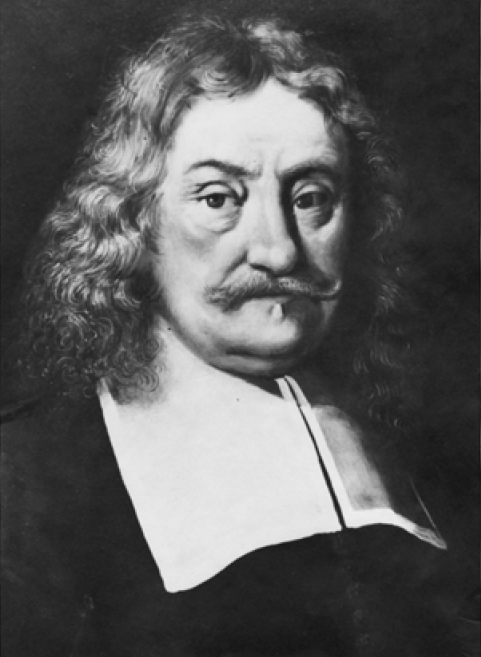
Gottfried Welsch died 5 September

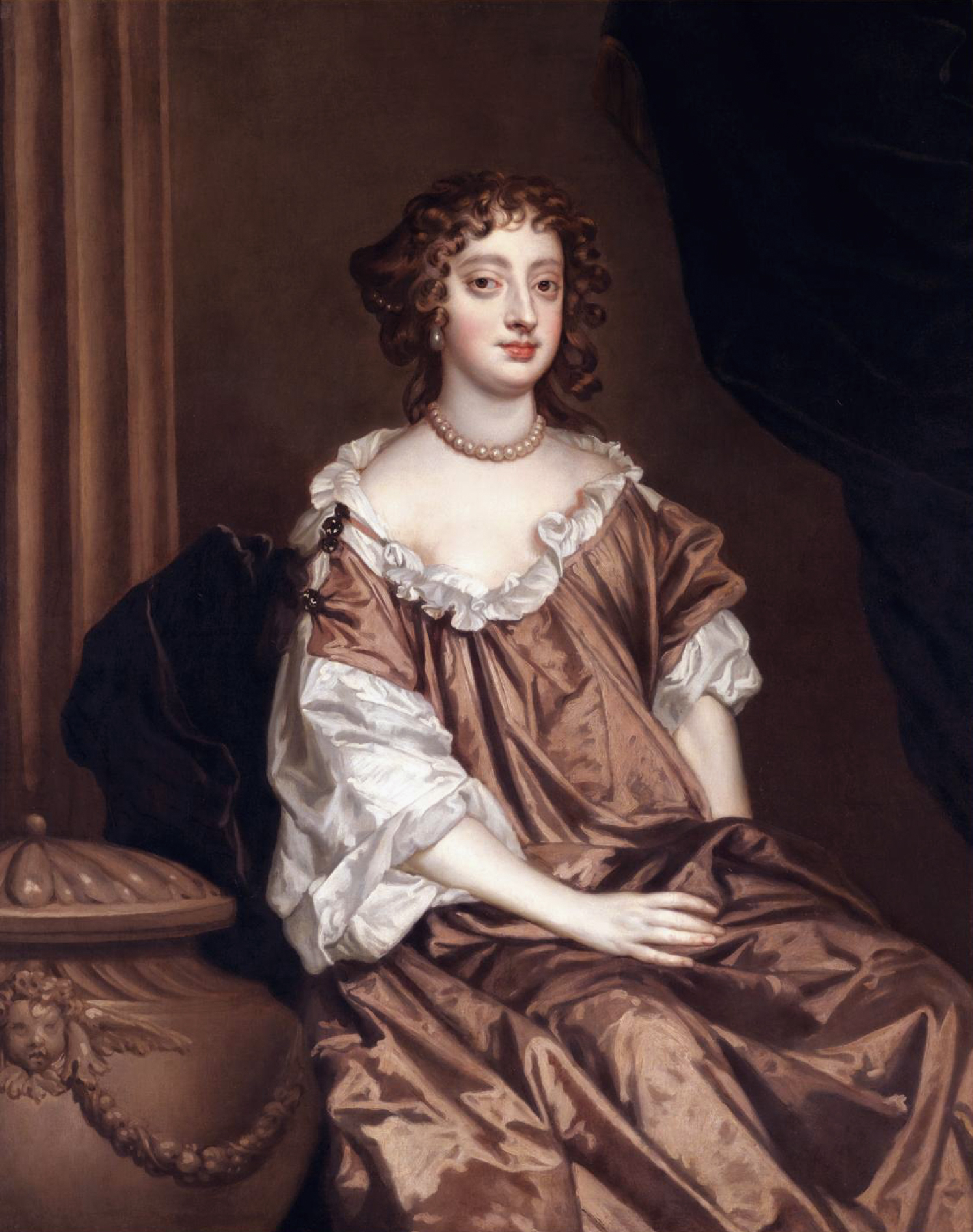
Elizabeth Percy, Countess of Northumberland died 19 September

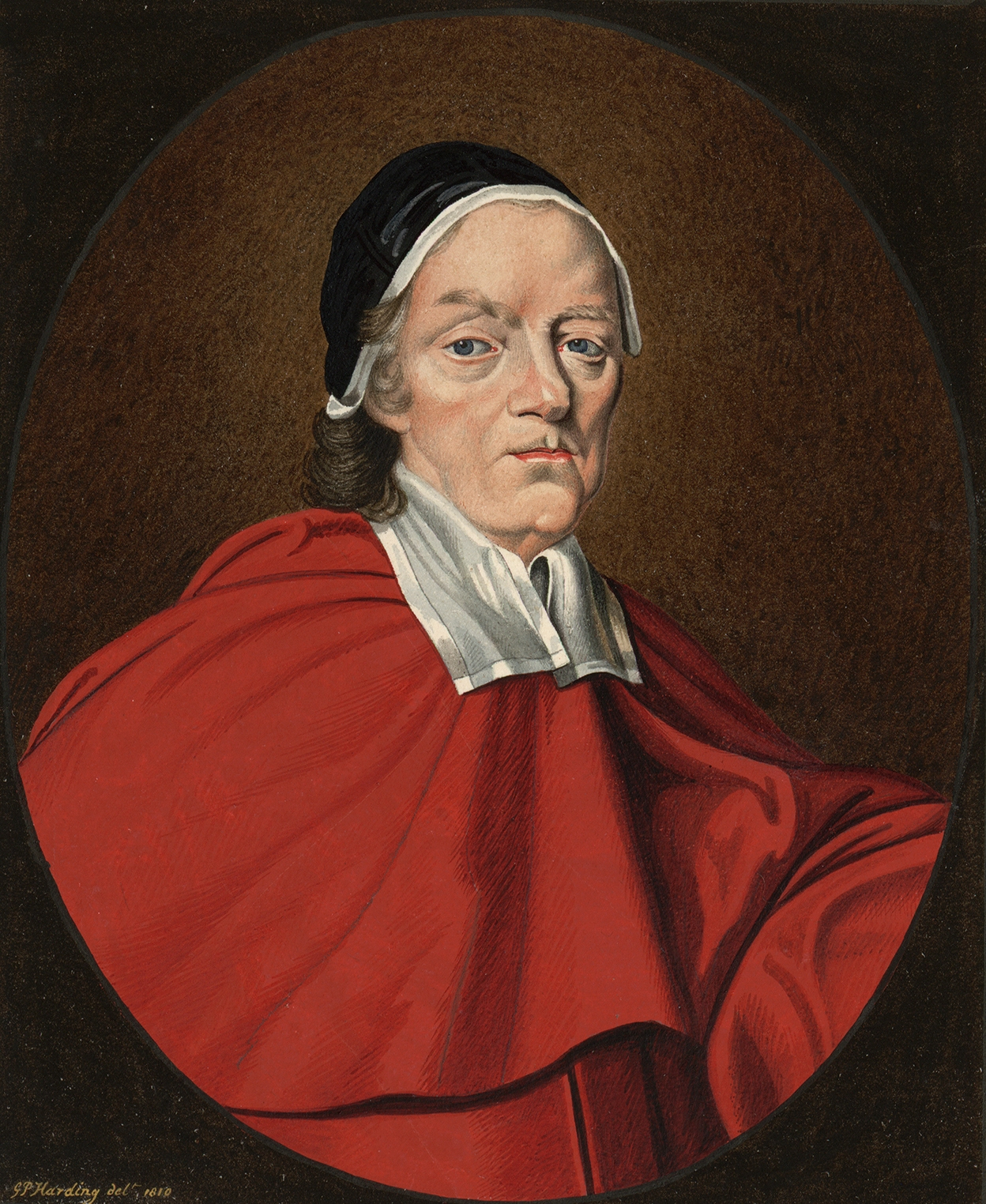
John Maynard (1604–1690) died 9 October

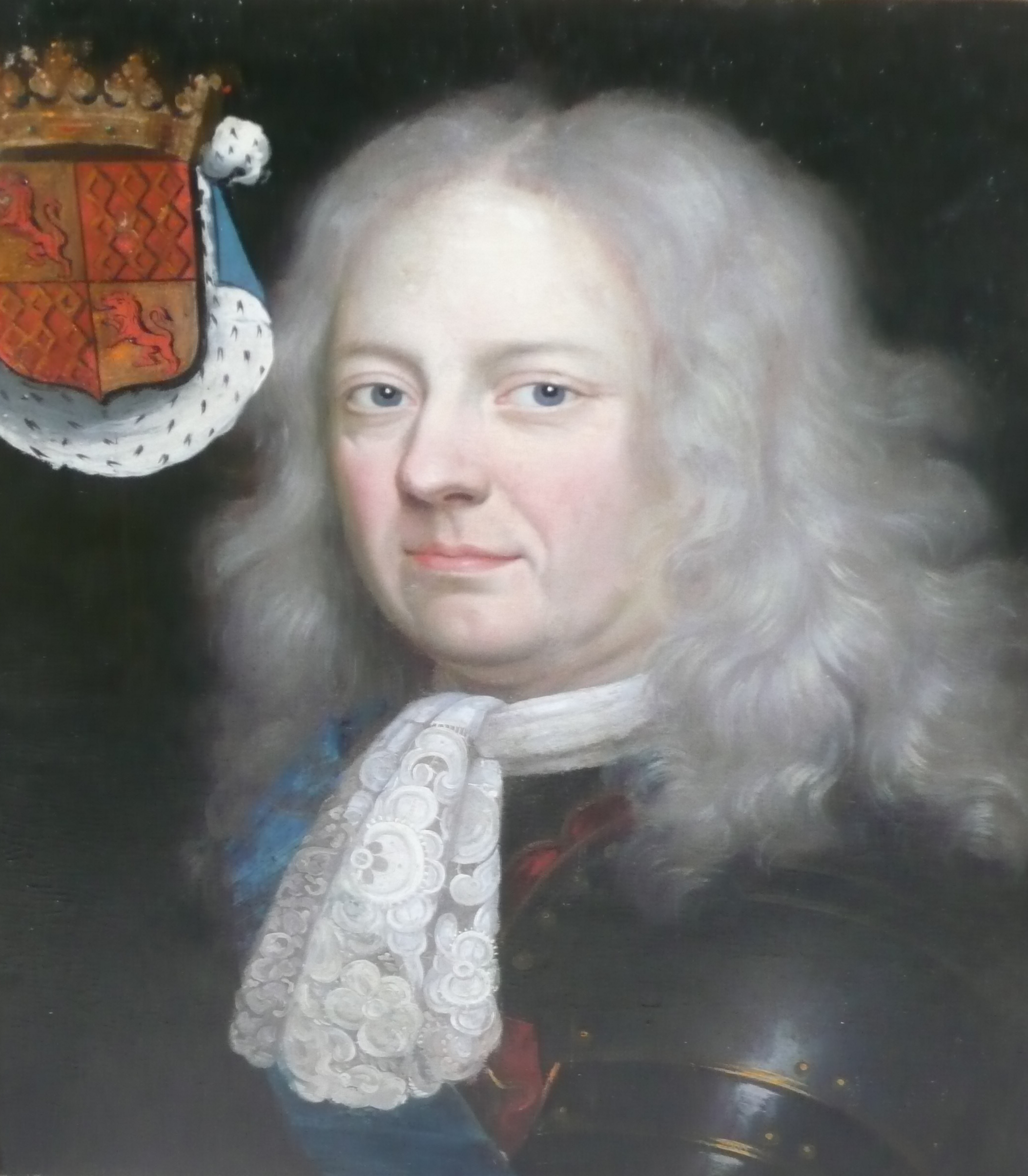
Louis Charles d'Albert de Luynes died 10 October

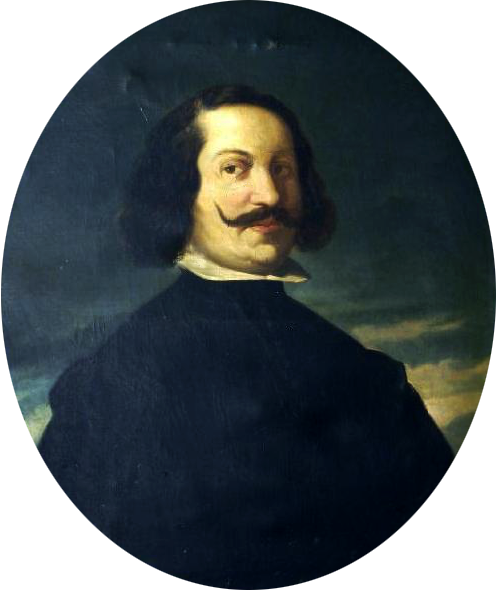
Juan de Valdés Leal died 15 October

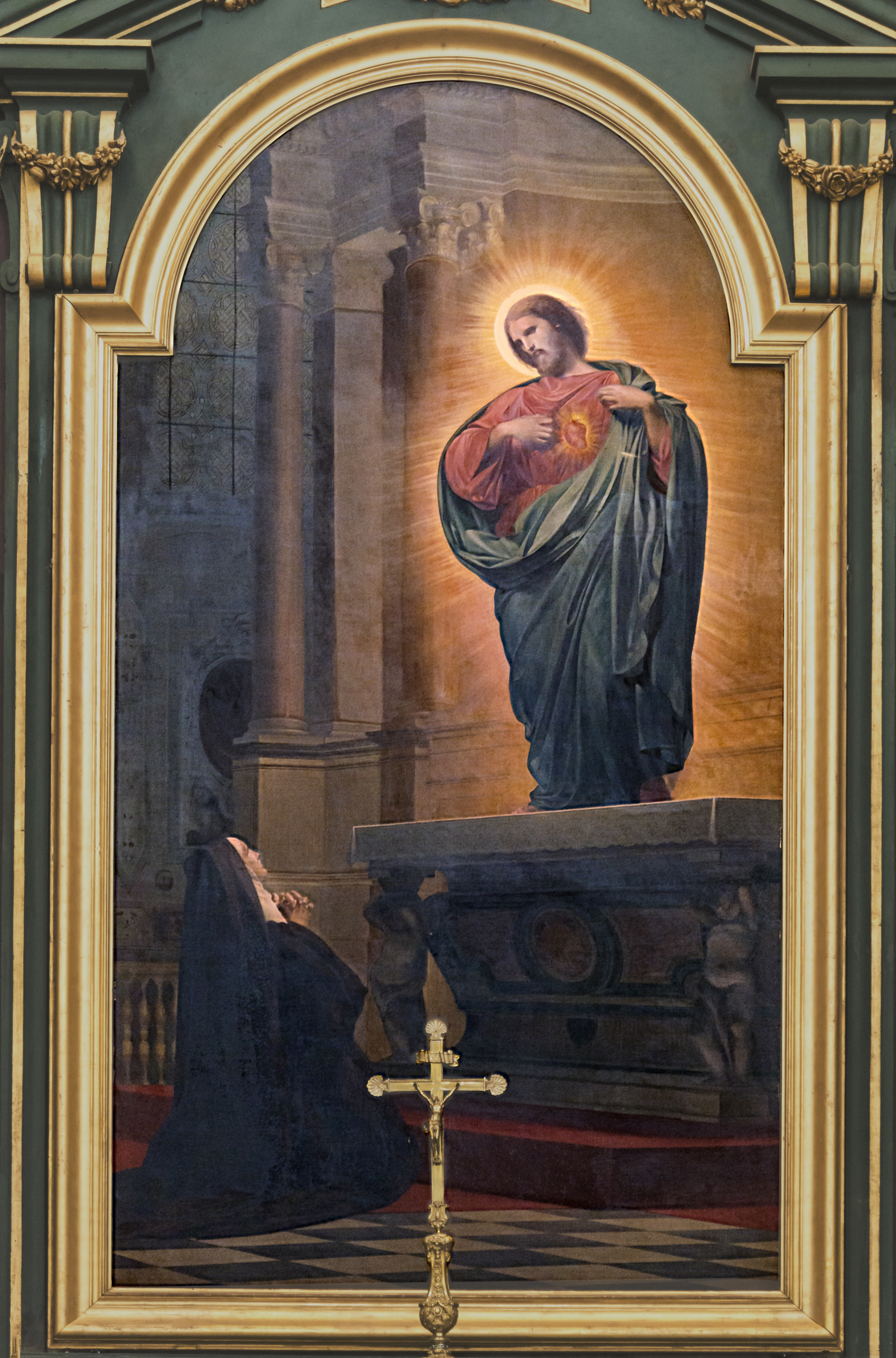
Margaret Mary Alacoque died 17 October

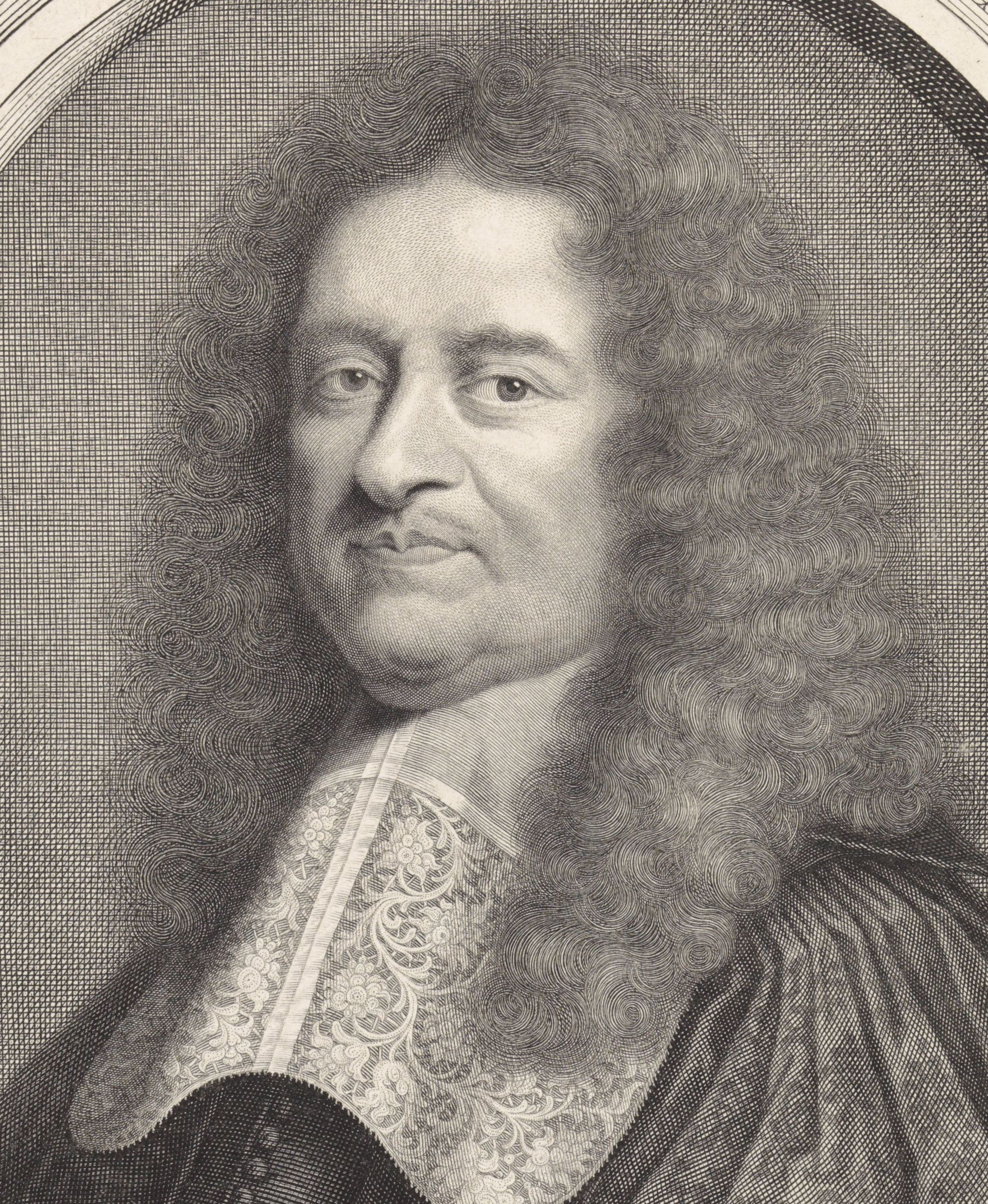
Jean-Baptiste Christyn died 25 October

=== January–March ===
- February 14 – John Berry, Royal Navy officer (b. 1635)
- January 3 – Hillel ben Naphtali Zevi, Lithuanian rabbi (b. 1615)
- January 8 – Andrei Bezobrazov, Russian official (b. 1614)
- January 20 – Johannes Gezelius the elder, Finnish bishop (b. 1615)
- January 26 – Marcjan Aleksander Ogiński, Polish noble (b. 1632)
- January 27 – Anna Eleonore of Stolberg-Wernigerode, politician (b. 1651)
- February 1
  - George Livingston, 3rd Earl of Linlithgow, Scottish politician (b. 1616)
  - Philippe Mestrezat, Genevan minister (b. 1618)
- February 3 – Anne Doddington (b. 1642)
- February 6 – Jan van Buken, Flemish painter (b. 1635)
- February 7
  - John Faldo, English minister (b. 1633)
  - Sir William Morice, 1st Baronet, English royalist statesman (b. 1620)
- February 9
  - John Louis, Count of Nassau-Ottweiler (b. 1625)
  - David Pieterse Schuyler, Dutch-born fur trader, ship's captain and merchant (b. 1636)
- February 10 – Gijsbert Verhoek, Dutch painter (b. 1644)
- February 20 – Theodor Caroli, German physician (b. 1660)
- February 22 – Charles Le Brun, French painter and art theorist (b. 1619)
- February 23 – Elizabeth Walker, English pharmacist (b. 1623)
- February 27 – Edward Montagu, English politician (b. 1649)
- March 1 – Richard Wenman, 4th Viscount Wenman, English politician and Irish Viscount (b. 1657)
- March 5 – Joshua Janavel, waldensian rebel (b. 1617)
- March 17
  - Jan van Mieris, Dutch painter (b. 1660)
  - Patriarch Joachim of Moscow, Patriarch of Moscow (b. 1620)
- March 18 – Sir William Portman, 6th Baronet, English politician (b. 1643)
- March 20 – Sebastián Muñoz, painter (b. 1654)
- March 21 – Henry Teonge, British writer (b. 1621)
- March 28 – Emmanuel Tzanes, Greek Painter (b. 1610)

=== April–June ===
- April 1
  - James Annesley, 2nd Earl of Anglesey, politician (b. 1645)
  - Johann Christoph von Freyberg-Allmendingen, German priest (b. 1616)
- April 6 – Gedeon Chetvertinsky, Ruthenian prince, religious figure, Metropolitan of Kiev (b. 1634)
- April 15 – Michael I Apafi, Hungarian Prince of Transylvania (b. 1632)
- April 16 – Gesina ter Borch, Dutch Golden Age painter (b. 1633)
- April 17 – Caspar Ziegler, German jurist, poet and composer (b. 1621)
- April 18
  - Melchior Heßler, German engineer and builder (b. 1619)
  - Ayaşlı Ismail Pasha, Ottoman Grand Vizier (b. 1620)
  - Charles V, Duke of Lorraine, Austrian-born general of the Holy Roman Empire (b. 1643)
- April 20 – Maria Anna Victoria of Bavaria, Dauphine of France (b. 1660)
- April 21 – Jacob de Graeff, member of the De Graeff-family from the Dutch Golden Age (b. 1642)
- April 25 – David Teniers the Younger, Flemish painter (b. 1610)
- April 28 – Étienne Le Hongre, French sculptor (b. 1628)
- April 30 – René Le Pays, French poet (b. 1634)
- May 9
  - Theodore Haak, German-born scholar (b. 1605)
  - Raymond Poisson, French actor (b. 1630)
  - Abraham Wright, English theological writer and deacon (b. 1611)
- May 12 – John Rushworth, English author of Historical Collections (b. c. 1612)
- May 15 – Eberhard Werner Happel, author (b. 1647)
- May 21 – John Eliot, Puritan missionary to the American Indians (b. 1604)
- May 22 – Johann Jacob Schütz, German lawyer (b. 1640)
- May 23 – Francesco di Maria, Italian painter (b. 1623)
- May 26
  - Samuel Lincoln, American colonial ancestor of Abraham Lincoln (b. 1622)
  - Luís de Meneses, 3rd Count of Ericeira, Portuguese politician and historian (b. 1632)
- May 27 – Giovanni Legrenzi, Italian composer (b. 1626)
- June 4
  - Sir Charles Erskine, 1st Baronet of Alva, Scottish politician (b. 1643)
  - François Tortebat, French engraver (b. 1616)
- June 8 – Jean Prestet, French priest and mathematician (b. 1648)
- June 11 – Frederik Bloemaert, Dutch printmaker and draftsman (b. 1610)
- June 13 – Maurice Berkeley, 3rd Viscount Fitzhardinge, English politician (b. 1628)
- June 19 – Ezekiel Hopkins, Irish bishop (b. 1634)

=== July–September ===
- July 1
  - Albrecht Georg of Limburg, Count of Limburg (b. 1660)
  - Sir Neil O'Neill, 2nd Baronet, Irish Catholic nobleman and soldier (b. 1658)
  - Philipp, Duke of Saxe-Merseburg-Lauchstädt, German nobleman (b. 1657)
  - George Walker, Irish soldier and Anglican priest (b. 1645)
- July 8 – Aaron ben Moses Teomim, rabbi (b. 1630)
- July 9 – Hosokawa Yukitaka, daimyo (b. 1637)
- July 10
  - Jan van Brakel, Dutch admiral (b. 1638)
  - Domenico Gabrielli, Italian cellist and composer (b. 1659)
- July 11
  - John Burnyeat, British Quaker writer (b. 1631)
  - Frederick Schomberg, 1st Duke of Schomberg, Marshal of France (b. 1615)
- July 15 – Carlo Antonio Bussi, Swiss artist (b. 1658)
- July 21
  - Gregorio Carafa, Calabrian-born 62nd Grandmaster of the Knights Hospitaller (b. 1615)
  - Cristobal of Saint Catherine, Spanish Catholic priest (b. 1638)
- July 23 – Richard Gibson, British artist (b. 1615)
- July 25 – François Bailly, French mason and architect (b. 1630)
- July 28 – Baptist Noel, English politician (b. 1658)
- July 29 – John Brockett, co-founder of New Haven Colony (b. 1611)
- August 5 – Sebastiano Pisani, Roman Catholic prelate who was Bishop of Verona (b. 1630)
- August 10 – Johannes Spilberg, Dutch painter (b. 1619)
- August 17 – Gasparo Cavalieri, Italian cardinal (b. 1648)
- August 20 – Alexander von Bournonville, Flemish noble and general (b. 1616)
- August 31 – Mary Thimelby, prioress of St Monica's, Louvain, and author (b. 1610)
- September 2 – Philip William, Elector Palatine, German-born ruler (b. 1615)
- September 5
  - Louis-François de la Baume de Suze, Roman Catholic bishop (b. 1595)
  - Gottfried Welsch, German physician (b. 1618)
- September 8
  - Jens Mikkelsen Ehrenborg, Danish soldier and public servant who later became a Swedish nobleman (b. 1621)
  - Sir William Glynne, 1st Baronet, English politician (b. 1638)
  - Sebastien Knab, Roman Catholic prelate, Archbishop of Nakhijevan (b. 1632)
  - Lazzaro Morelli, Italian artist (b. 1608)
- September 14 – José Jiménez Donoso, painter (b. 1632)
- September 17 – William Pierrepont, 4th Earl of Kingston-upon-Hull, English Earl (b. 1662)
- September 19
  - Giovanni Stefano Danedi, Italian painter (b. 1612)
  - Elizabeth Percy, Countess of Northumberland, English noble (b. 1646)
- September 21 – Wriothesley Noel, 2nd Earl of Gainsborough, English politician (b. 1661)
- September 23 – Yebušu, duke of the First Rank (b. 1627)
- September 25 – Pieter van Lint, Flemish painter (b. 1609)
- September 26 – Joachim Ernst von Grumbkow, German general (b. 1637)

=== October–December ===
- October 1 – Girolamo Corner, Venetian statesman and military commander (b. 1632)
- October 3 – Robert Barclay, Scottish Quaker apologist (b. 1648)
- October 7
  - Arnold van Ravesteyn, Dutch Golden Age painter (b. 1605)
  - Jacques Savary, successful French merchant (b. 1622)
- October 9
  - Henry FitzRoy, 1st Duke of Grafton, Illegitimate son of King Charles II and English duke (b. 1663)
  - Joseph Judson, deputy (b. 1619)
  - John Maynard, English lawyer and politician; (b. 1604)
- October 10
  - Laurids Lindenov, Danish nobleman and civil servant in Norway (b. 1640)
  - Louis Charles d'Albert de Luynes, French aristocrat (b. 1620)
- October 13 – Ole Borch, Danish scientist (b. 1626)
- October 15
  - Juan de Valdés Leal, Spanish painter and etcher (b. 1622)
  - Adam Frans van der Meulen, Flemish painter (b. 1632)
- October 17 – Margaret Mary Alacoque, Catholic Saint and Mystic (b. 1647)
- October 20 – Sir Henry Felton, 2nd Baronet, English Member of Parliament (b. 1619)
- October 21 – Isabel Luísa, Princess of Beira, Portuguese Royal (b. 1669)
- October 22 (buried) – William Ball (astronomer), English astronomer (b. c. 1631)
- October 23
  - Thomas Minor, American city founder (b. 1608)
  - Antonie Waterloo, Flemish painter and engraver (b. 1609)
- October 25
  - Jean-Baptiste Christyn, Jurist and diplomat in the Spanish Netherlands and Chancellor of Brabant (b. 1630)
  - Cornelius Hazart, Dutch Jesuit priest, polemical author (b. 1617)
- October 27 – Sir Robert Markham, 2nd Baronet, English politician (b. 1644)
- October 30 – Hieronymus van Beverningh, Dutch diplomat and politician (b. 1614)
- November 3
  - Jean-Baptiste Colbert, Marquis de Seignelay, French politician (b. 1651)
  - Nicholas Delves, English politician (b. 1618)
- November 4 – Johann Wilhelm, Duke of Saxe-Jena, German noble (b. 1675)
- November 5 – Giacomo Villani, catholic Bishop (b. 1605)
- November 12 – Francesco Arrigua, Roman Catholic prelate, Bishop of Nicotera (b. 1615)
- November 17 – Charles de Sainte-Maure, duc de Montausier, French military leader (b. 1610)
- November 27 – Renier Meganck, Flemish painter (b. 1637)
- December 1 – Stephen Greenleaf, American colonial politician (b. 1628)
- December 10 – Francis Morley, English Member of Parliament (b. 1623)
- December 15 – Sir Thomas Allen, 1st Baronet, Baronet of London, in the County of Middlesex (b. 1630)
- December 16 – Louise Elisabeth of Courland, Landgrave of Hesse-Homburg (b. 1646)
- December 19 – Gustaf Düben, Swedish composer (b. 1628)
- December 23 – Sir John Johnston, 3rd Baronet, Scottish army officer and kidnapper (b. 1648)
- December 28 – Tommaso Costa, Italian painter (b. 1634)
- December 30 – Philip Babington, politician (b. 1632)
