= Andrei Bezobrazov =

Russian official (d. 1690)

Andrei Ilyich Bezobrazov (Russian: Андрей Ильич Безобразов; died 8 January 1690) was a Russian official. His case attracted a lot of attention, and is known as the last of several large witch trials held in connection to the Czar's court in 17th-century Moscow, as well as the last high-profile witch trial in Russia.

He was arrested in 1689 and charged with having hired two wizards to "soften the heart" of Czar Peter I, with the purpose of preventing the monarch from giving him a post which would place him long away from his comfortable life in the capital. To expose the monarch to sorcery, regardless of purpose, was regarded as a danger to his life.

In the following inquest, several people were implicated directly or indirectly in the process. Bezobrazov was sentenced to death by a jury of boyars and decapitated on the Red Square in Moscow on 8 January 1690, while the two wizards he hired to perform the magic were burned alive at the stake. His wife was forced to enter a convent, while several people judged as being directly or indirectly involved in the case were exiled.
