= Robert Woodcock =

English painter

Robert Woodcock (bap. 9 October 1690 – 10 April 1728) was an English marine painter, musician, and composer who lived during the Baroque period. He is notable for having published the earliest known flute and English oboe concertos.

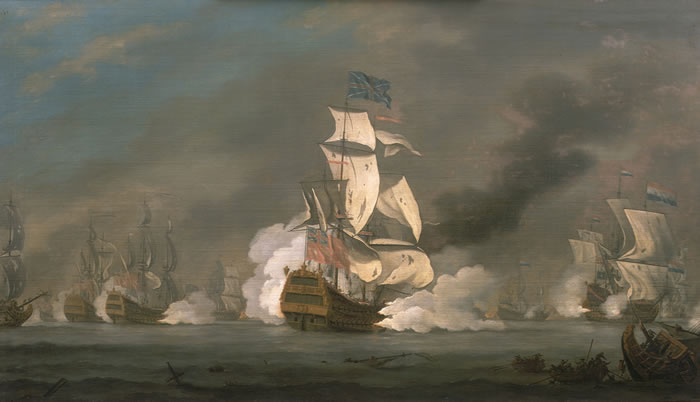
A Battle Between English and Dutch Ships by Robert Woodcock.(National Maritime Museum.)

== Life ==
Robert Woodcock was baptised at Chelsea Old Church on 9 October 1690, the son of Robert Woodcock (1642–1710) and Deborah Littleton. He grew up in Shrewsbury House, Chelsea, London, where his parents ran a girls school. His family was fairly affluent, and his father was described as a gentleman, indicating good social position.

In 1714, Robert junior married Ayliffe Stoaks, by whom he had several children. According to a contemporaneous biographical account, he worked as a civil servant, holding a "place or clerkship in the Government." He resigned his government post around 1723 to become a professional artist. Later in life he suffered acutely from gout, which eventually was the cause of his death, at the age of 38, on 10 April 1728. He is buried at Chelsea Old Church.

== Artistic and musical career ==
Woodcock was a marine painter, specialising in the painting of ships at sea. His style was strongly influenced by the Dutch painter Willem van de Velde the Younger, whose works he assiduously copied. He was also an accomplished musician and composer, performing on the oboe, recorder, and flute. He was perhaps most skilled on the flute, as in 1776, nearly 50 years after his death, he was described by John Hawkins as "a famous performer on the flute."

The engraver George Vertue, writing in 1725, called Woodcock "An ingenious gentleman lover of the arts of painting and music, and professor." Vertue goes on to describe Woodcock's musical talents, writing:

"He was very skillful in music, had judgement and performed on the hautboy in a masterly manner, there being many pieces, some published, and much approved by skillful masters in that science."

Vertue's account tells us that Woodcock was a well-respected performer and composer, and his description of Woodcock as a "professor" also seems to indicate that he taught – but whether painting or music it is impossible to say. Vertue also gives us a valuable indication as to what Woodcock may have looked like, describing him as "a man of genteel mien, well shape and good features."

== Concertos ==
Woodcock's only surviving compositions are a set of twelve concertos (3 for flute, 3 for recorder, and 3 for oboe) published by Walsh and Hare in London circa 1727. The concertos were originally published under the title: XII Concertos in Eight Parts, the first three for VIOLINS and one small FLUTE, the second three for VIOLINS and two small FLUTES, the third three for VIOLINS & one GERMAN FLUTE, and the three last for VIOLINS & one HOBOY. The proper Flute being nam'd to each Concerto.

The three flute concertos in this set are the earliest known published for that instrument, and the three oboe concertos are the first known by an English composer. Vivaldi published his opus 10 flute concertos shortly thereafter, in c.1728, and the earliest oboe concertos were published by the Italian composer Albinoni in 1715.

The earliest known mention of these works dates from 1722, when a theatre advertisement announced that "a new concerto, compos'ed by Mr. Woodcock" would be performed by recorder player John Baston on 14 March of that year. This performance is noteworthy in that it shows that at least one of the recorder concertos was written earlier than the publication date. There is other evidence of performances of Woodcock's concerti from the 1720s through the 1750s, suggesting that his works quickly became part of the standard woodwind repertoire in England at that time.

There has been some controversy as to whether or not Woodcock actually wrote these twelve concertos, however. In 1954 Brian Priestman ascribed them to Jean-Baptiste Loeillet of London, and when some of the concertos were published in 1935, they were attributed to George Frideric Handel. More recent scholarship, however, supports the authorship of Robert Woodcock.

== Instrumentation ==
- Concerto no. 1 in E major: sixth flute, violins I and II, basso continuo
- Concerto no. 2 in A major: sixth flute, violins I and II, basso continuo
- Concerto no. 3 in D major: sixth flute, violins I and II, basso continuo
- Concerto no. 4 in b minor: 2 sixth flutes, violins I and II, basso continuo
- Concerto no. 5 in D major: 2 sixth flutes, violins I and II, viola, basso continuo
- Concerto no. 6 in D major: 2 sixth flutes, violins I and II, basso continuo
- Concerto no. 7 in b minor: transverse flute, violins I and II, basso continuo
- Concerto no. 8 in D major: transverse flute, violins I and II, basso continuo
- Concerto no. 9 in e minor: transverse flute, violins I and II, basso continuo
- Concerto no. 10 in e minor: oboe, violins I and II, viola, basso continuo
- Concerto no. 11 in c minor: oboe, violins I and II, viola, basso continuo
- Concerto no. 12 in E♭ major: oboe, violins I and II, basso continuo
