= Samuel van der Putte =

Dutch explorer

- Born: 26 February 1690; Vlissingen, Dutch Republic
- Died: 27 September 1745 (aged 55); Batavia, Dutch East Indies
- Occupation(s): Explorer, linguist, naturalist
- Known for: Exploration of Tibet

Samuel van der Putte (26 February 1690 – 27 September 1745) was a Dutch explorer, linguist, and naturalist most famous for his journeys in Asia, especially to Tibet.

== Life ==
Van der Putte was born on 26 February 1690 in Vlissingen in the Dutch Republic. He was the son of the Dutch vice-admiral Karel or Carel van der Putte and his wife Johanna Cornelia Samuels Biscop. Admiral Van der Putte died when Samuel was five years old. (Note: Markham mistakenly gives 1725.)

He studied law in Leiden, getting his degree in 1714 and returning to work in Vlissingen, where he became an alderman the next year. In 1718, he left for Italy, improving his Italian and studying medicine in Padua. He returned to the Netherlands in 1721 but soon left for Constantinople in the Ottoman Empire. From there, he visited the Aegean Archipelago, Cairo, the Sinai, and Palestine. From Aleppo in Syria, he traveled with a caravan to Isfahan, Persia, and thence to Dutch-allied Cochin in India.

He travelled extensively through India disguised as a Muslim trader, meeting the Jesuit missionary Ippolito Desideri in Patna in August 1725. He copied about 20 pages of Desideri's notes on Tibet and, after visiting Dutch Ceylon the next year, he passed through the Mughal Empire and followed Desideri's route through Nepal and Ladakh to Lhasa in Tibet, reaching it about 1728. (Note: Landon misdates this trip to 1724. Waller misdates it to 1718.) The Dalai Lama at the time was the 7th incarnation, Kelzang Gyatso, but the warlord Polhané Sönam Topgyé had just overcome a coup with Chinese help. He maintained his position by permitting their ambans to station troops in Lhasa and act as de facto governors.

Unlike other visitors to the interior of China at the time, usually Catholic missionaries, Van der Putte was acting as a commercial agent. Besides an anonymous French trader who reached Lhasa in 1717, Van der Putte is the only foreign layman known to have visited Tibet during the 18th century. He had been obliged by local xenophobia and Qing border regulations to again disguise himself as a native on his journey to avoid assault or arrest and deportation to Guangzhou and Portuguese Macao. In Lhasa, he learned Standard Tibetan and befriended its lamas while staying with the Capuchin mission kept by Gioacchino da San Anatolia, Francesco della Penna, Cassiano da Macerata, and others. His religious opinions scandalized the Italian monks, whose letters variously describe him as agnostic or heretical. Cassiano nonetheless describes him as an honest man.

He left Lhasa for Beijing (then romanized as "Peking") in 1731 in the company of a caravan of lamas bound for the imperial capital. It followed the same route later made famous by Abbé Huc's account of his travels. A passage of Putte's journals quoted in a missionary's letter describes his passage of the upper Yangtze (under the name "Bicin" or "Bi-tsion") on hide boats; the river was so wide and passage so slow that the travelers were obliged to rest on an island in the middle of the stream before completing the crossing the next day. The route continued north through Qinghai ("Koko Nor") and east across the Ordos Loop to the Great Wall of China northwest of the capital.

After his visit to Beijing, he returned to Lhasa in 1736 along a more southerly route that took him through Kham and southeastern Tibet. While in Lhasa, he stayed at the house that had been abandoned by the Catholic monks during his absence. During one of his visits in Lhasa, his conversation with the son of a minister from Sikkim led to his creating a manuscript map of the states of the central Himalayas, the first European map to correctly mark Bhutan (under a variation of the name "Drukpa") as an independent state in the correct location instead of as a misunderstanding of Tibet. He reached India again around 1737, (Note: Landon misdates this to 1735. Waller misdates it to 1730.) using the arduous western route through western Tibet and Kashmir.

Returned to India, he witnessed Nader Shah's 1739 Sack of Delhi following the Battle of Karnal before leaving Bengal to settle in Batavia, Dutch East Indies in 1743. His last journey seems to have been a visit to Mount Ophir in Dutch Malacca in September of that year. Intending to return home to the Netherlands, he fell ill and died on 27 September 1745 at Batavia.

== Works ==
The importance of Van der Putte's exploration was less than that of some of his contemporaries since his constant travels kept him from publishing any public narrative of his observations. Instead, from his deathbed in Batavia, his will directed that his journal and many notes—which he had kept on slips of paper during his travels—be burned. He did this to prevent their "improper use", which some have taken to mean risking the addition of fraudulent notes in order to exploit the authority of his name and others to mean permitting their use by the British. Nonetheless, some scholars have compiled what is known of his travels (mostly through the letters of the various missionaries) and some of his surviving belongings are kept at the museum in The Hague.

Two of his notes known to have survived were two undated manuscript maps, one that drawn of the eastern Himalayan states mentioned above and the other a map of Tibet with its places named in Tibetan and Italian. Both were held by a museum in Middelburg, where they were destroyed by Allied bombing during World War II. The Himalayan map survived in duplicate thanks to its inclusion by Sir Clements Markham in his book on George Bogle's later trip to Tibet.
