= James Ward (priest) =

James Ward (24 January 1690- 15 June 1736) was an Anglican priest in Ireland in the 18th century.

Ward was born in Dublin and educated at Trinity College, Dublin. He was Dean of Cloyne from 1726 until his death.
