= Placidus Böcken =

German lawyer

Placidus Böcken (or Böckhn) (13 July 1690 – 9 February 1752) was a German Benedictine canon lawyer, and Vice-Chancellor of the University of Salzburg.

== Life ==
Böcken was born in Munich, in Bavaria. He entered the Order of St. Benedict at an early age, made his religious profession at the Abbey of St. Peter, Salzburg, in 1706, and was ordained to the priesthood in 1713. Having been made a Doctor of Canon and Civil Law (1715), he was sent to Rome and on his return was chosen, in 1721, to succeed Benedict Schmier, as professor of canon law at the Benedictine University of Salzburg, where he remained for a period of twenty years.

He was also attached to the theological faculties of Salzburg and Fulda, was secretary of the university, and an ecclesiastical councillor of four successive archbishops in the See of Salzburg and of the Prince-Abbot of Fulda. Eventually he appears to have incurred the displeasure of Archbishop Leopold of Salzburg, and in consequence of repeated friction resigned his position in 1741. He was then made pastor of Dornbach, a suburb of Vienna, and, two years later, superior of Maria-Plain near Salzburg, where he spent the last nine years of his life as confessor to the many pilgrims.

== Works ==
The "Commentarius in Jus Canonicum universum" which Böcken published at Salzburg (1735–39), and dedicated to his friend and patron the Prince-Abbot of Fulda, is his major work. He had previously (1722–28) issued a number of separate treatises on the five books of the Decretals; these were updated in his larger work, to the third volume of which, in an appendix, he also added a lengthy disquisition "De praescriptionibus". A reprint of the "Commentarius" appeared at Paris in 1776.

== Theology ==
Böcken held rather extreme views on the subject of the veneration due the saints. He maintained that the special veneration and invocation of the saints, particularly of the Blessed Virgin Mary, is absolutely necessary for salvation. A sermon which he preached on this subject in 1740 precipitated an acrid discussion at the university between the members of the "Old School" and the "New School" of theology, between the Sycophantae and the Illuminati as they were called. The sermon appeared also in print, with annotations wherein Böcken characterized as erroneous the contrary opinion of Muratori.
