= Gottfried Welsch =

German physician (1618–1690)

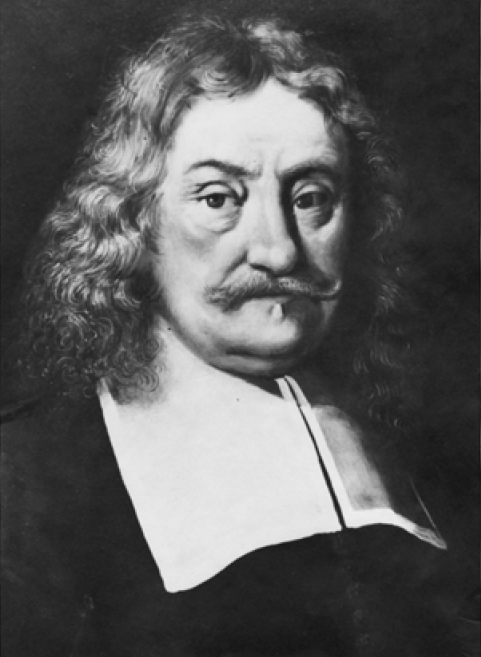
Gottfried Welsch

Gottfried Welsch (November 12, 1618 – September 5, 1690) was a German physician born in Leipzig.

In 1644 he became a professor of anatomy at the University of Leipzig, and afterwards a professor of physiology (1647), pathology (1662) and therapy (1668). He held the title of city physician (Stadtphysikus) in Leipzig, and in 1665 became rector at the University of Leipzig.

Welsch was one of the founders of German forensic medicine, and remembered for introducing fundamental criteria for evaluation of fatal wounds and poisonings. His best known written work in forensics was the 1660 Rationale vulnerum lethalium judicium.
