= Louis-Guillaume Verrier =

Louis-Guillaume Verrier (October 19, 1690 – September 13, 1758) was a lawyer in the parliament of Paris and attorney general of the Sovereign Council of New France.

The son of Guillaume Verrier, king's attorney, and Marie-Madeleine Thibault, he was born in Paris, studied law and was admitted to the bar of Paris in August 1712. After Mathieu-Benoît Collet died in Quebec, Verrier sought to become his replacement and was named to the attorney general position in April 1728. He arrived in New France in September of that year. In 1730, French ministre de la marine Maurepas assigned him the task of examining the minute-books of the notaries of the provost court of Quebec and also compiling a list of any errors in notarial deeds with recommended remedies. In 1732, he was asked to compile a registry of all landed property in New France, a task which took Verrier eight years to complete.

He taught courses on law, which are believed to have been the first such courses given in North America. His students included Jean-Victor Varin de la Marre, François Foucault, Jacques de Lafontaine de Belcour, Guillaume Guillimin, René-Ovide Hertel de Rouville, Jean-François Gaultier and Jacques Imbert.

Verrier died intestate at Quebec City at the age of 67 and his succession was not settled until January 1776.

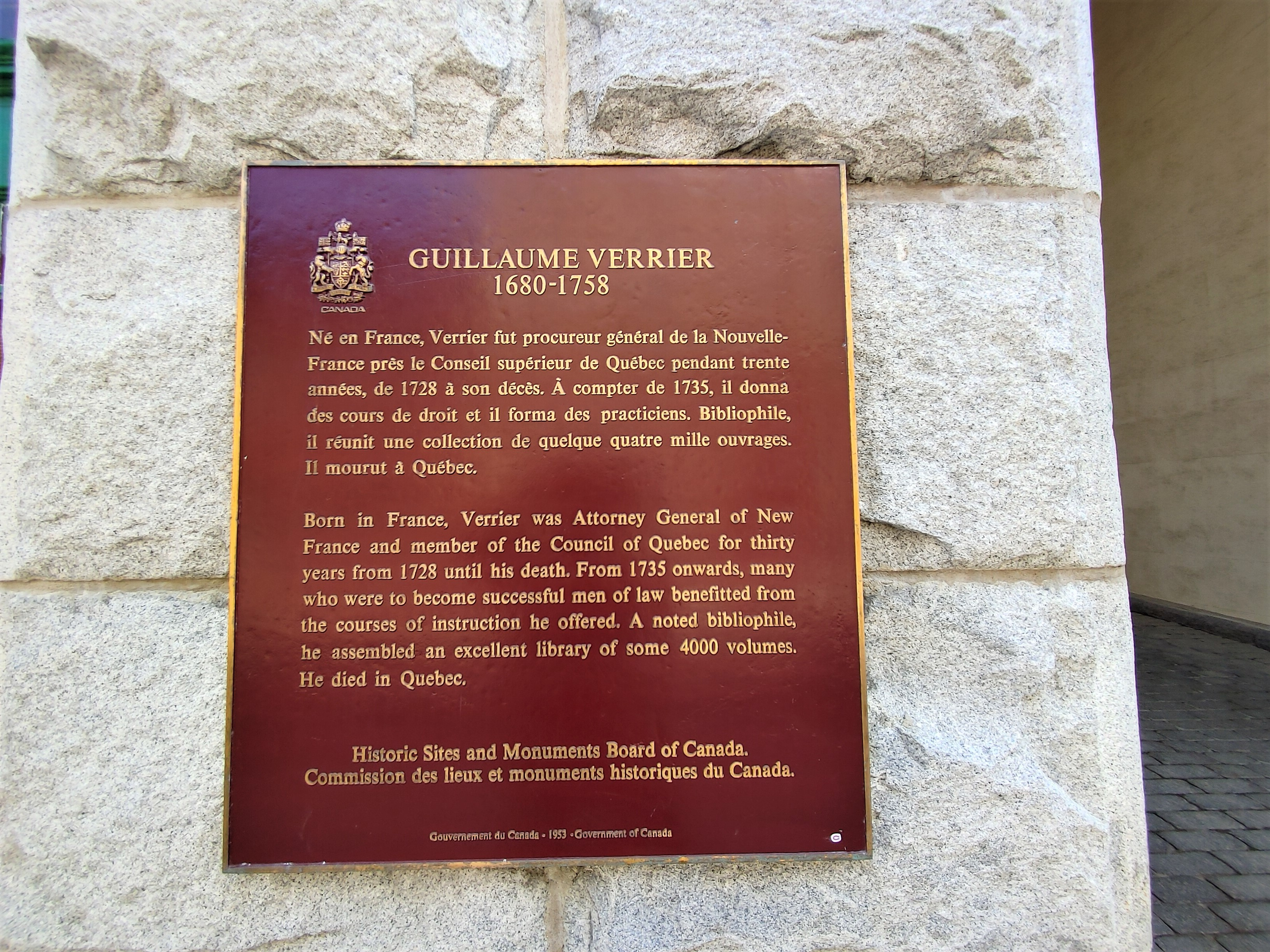
Guillaume Verrier's commemorative plaque, 17, Sainte-Famille street, Quebec City
