= Johann Jakob Schmauss =

German jurist (1690–1757)

Johann Jakob Schmauss (10 March 1690 – 8 April 1757) was a German jurist, historian, and university professor.

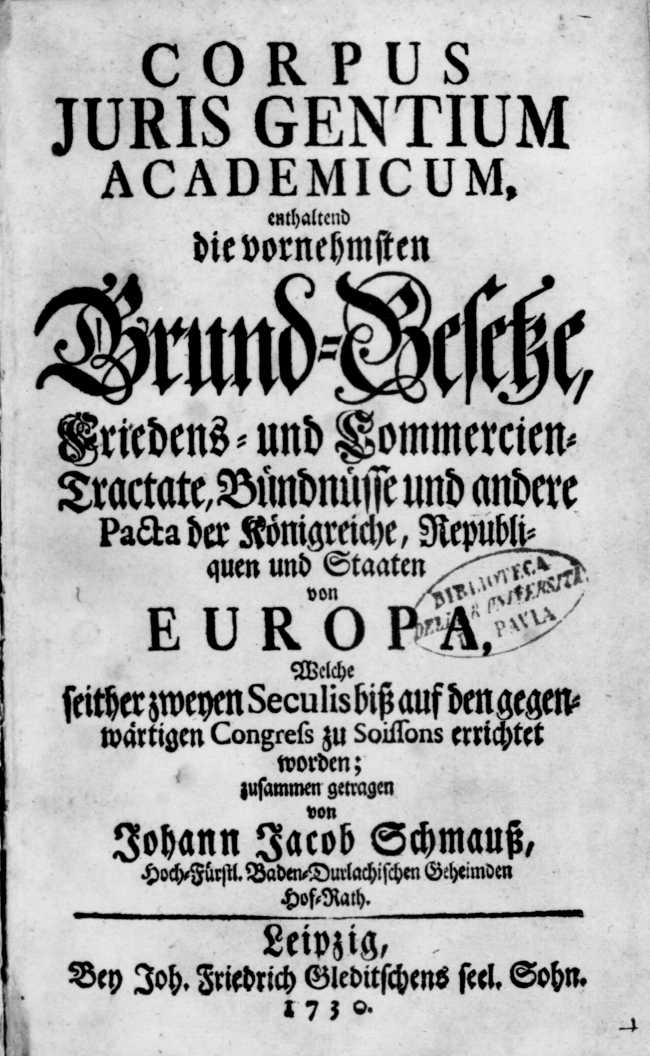
Corpus iuris gentium academicum, 1730

== Biography ==
Johann Jakob Schmauss was born in Landau which was then part of France. After attending school in Durlach and Stuttgart, he studied at the University of Strasbourg (then in France) and the University of Halle, where he fell under the influence of Christian Thomasius and Nicolaus Hieronymus Gundling. He obtained his Habilitation in 1712, qualifying him to hold lectures in history. At this time Schmauss began regularly publishing journals. Without limiting his literary activities, in 1721 he joined the service of the Margrave of Baden-Durlach, first as a councilor. In 1722 he published Corpus juris publici Germanici academicum, the first clear guide to imperial public law; the study went through seven editions by 1794. On 29 April 1734, Schmauss held the chair of Natural Law (historiarum et juris naturae et gentium) in Göttingen. After he accepted a call to return to Halle, where he held an equivalent post, and briefly taught at Leipzig, but in 1744, he returned again to his previous position at Göttingen, where he remained until his death.

== Works ==
In Latin

- Corpus juris publici Germanici academicum, Leipzig, 1722.
- Corpus iuris gentium academicum. Leipzig: Johann Gottlieb Gleditsch. 1730.
- Dissertationes juris naturalis quibus principia nom systematis hujus juris ex ipsis naturœ humanœ instinctibus extruendi proponuntur, Göttingen, 1742, in-8°.
- Compendium juris publici, 1746.

In German

- Einleitung zu der Staats-Wissenschafft (in Latin). Vol. 1. Leipzig: Johann Friedrich Gleditsch. 1741.
- Einleitung zu der Staats-Wissenschafft (in Latin). Vol. 2. Leipzig: Johann Friedrich Gleditsch. 1747.
- Neues Systema des Rechts der Natur (in Latin). Göttingen: Abram Vandenhoects Wittwe. 1754.
- Unpartheyische Prufung des neuen Systematis des Rechts der Natur (in Latin). Frankfurt am Main. 1755.
- J. J. Schmaußens akademische Reden und Vorlesungen über das Teutsche Staatsrecht, 1766 (posthumous).

In French

- Nouveau système du droit de la nature, 1745, in-8°, 1754.
