= François Tortebat =

French painter and engraver (1616–1690)

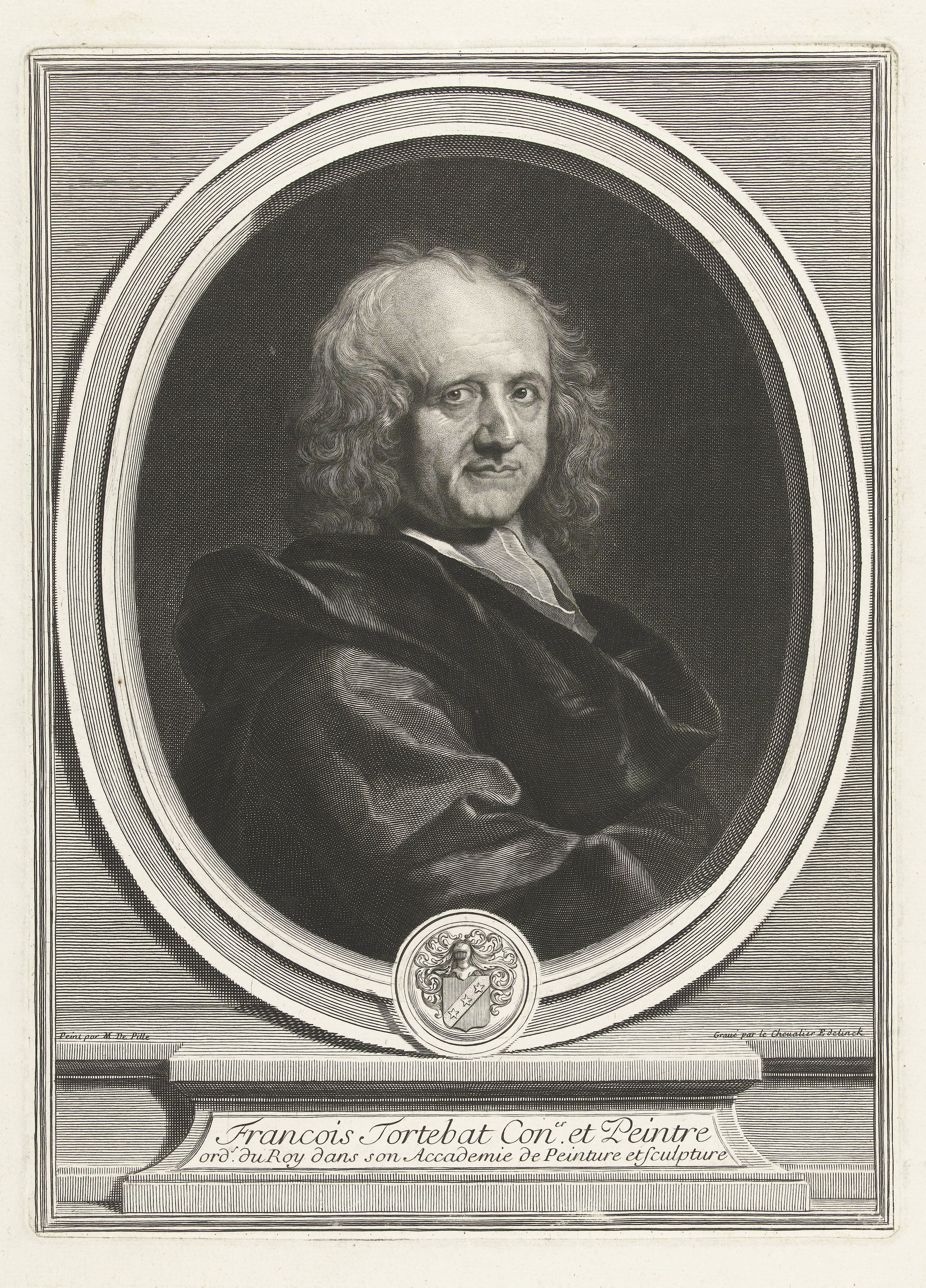
- Portrait of Tortebat by Gérard Edelinck after Roger de Piles.
- Born: 1616; Paris, France
- Died: June 4, 1690; Paris, France

François Tortebat (1616—June 4, 1690) was a French portrait painter and engraver.

== Career ==
Born to Louis Tortebat and Marguerite de Nameur, Tortebat joined the studio of Simon Vouet around 1631, and married his teacher's eldest daughter, Francoise, on November 9, 1643, with whom he had thirteen children. Tortebat is recorded as being in Rome between 1635 and 1640, making large copies of Raphael Cartoons as the result of a commission from Cardinal Antonio Barberini. Tortebat rejoined Vouet's studio upon his return to France.

After Vouet's death in 1649, Tortebat collaborated with his teacher's other son-in-law, Michel Dorigny, gaining exclusive rights to reproduce Vouet's works in print form, and designing the sets for Louis XIV's return to Paris with his new wife Maria Theresa of Spain in 1660.

Tortebat became a member of the Académie Royale de Peinture et de Sculpture in 1663, where his reception piece was a posthumous portrait of Vouet. Tortebat also published a series of etching after paintings by The Carracci from the Palazzo Magnani in Bologna. Tortebat died in Paris in 1690.
