= Giovanni Antonio Giay =

Italian composer

Giovanni Antonio Giay (sometimes spelled Giaj; 11 June 1690 – 10 September 1764) was an Italian composer. His compositional output includes 15 operas, 5 symphonies, and a significant amount of sacred music.

== Life and career ==
Born in Turin, Giay's father, Stefano Giuseppe Giay, was a chemist. His father died when he was 5 years old. In 1710, he entered the Collegio degli Innocenti at the Turin Cathedral, where he studied music with Francesco Fasoli. His first opera, Il trionfo d'Amore ossia La Fillide, premiered at the Teatro Carignano during Carnival of 1715. In 1732, he succeeded Andrea Stefano Fiorè as the maestro di cappella at the royal chapel in Turin at the behest of Charles Emmanuel III of Savoy. He remained in that post until his death 26 years later, after which his son, Francesco Saverio, took over the post from 1764 until 1798.

As master of the Cappella Regia, Giay wrote many religious and secular musical and operatic works. His work include Don Chisciotte in Venezia, an intermezzo written in 1748 to 1752, with lyrics by Giuseppe Baretti. The lyrics feature Miguel de Cervantes' characters Don Quixote and Dulcinea, during the carnival of Venice.
