= Theodor Caroli =

German physician (1660-1690)

Theodor Caroli (born 7 April 1660 in Tübingen; died 20 February 1690) was a German physician from Württemberg and a member of the German National Academy of Sciences Leopoldina.

== Life ==
Theodor Caroli was the son of Eva Maria Simoniusin and Andreas Caroli, princely Württemberg councilor and abbot in St. Georgen. Theodor Caroli studied medicine in Tübingen. He was initially a town physician in Urach, Duchy of Württemberg. He was then appointed physician of the city and area of Löwenberg (in today: Leonberg). On 29 September 1688 Theodor Caroli was admitted to the Leopoldina as a member (Matriculation No. 163) with the nickname NEPTUNUS. He died at the age of 30 just two years after the recording. Among other things, he worked on the “Blutschwamm” that grew on the oak tree.

== Work ==
- Theodor Caroli: From some special oak sponges, in: The Roman Imperial Academy of Natural Scientists selected Medicinisch = surgical = anatomical = chymical = and botanical treatises, 17th part with coppers, LV: perception; Wolfgang Schwarzkopf Nuremberg 1768

== Literature ==
- Andreas Elias Büchner : Academiae Sacri Romani Imperii Leopoldino-Carolinae Natvrae Cvriosorvm Historia. Litteris et impensis Ioannis Iustini Gebaueri, Halae Magdebvrgicae 1755, De Collegis, p. 476
- Johann Daniel Ferdinand Neigebaur : History of the Imperial Leopoldino-Carolinic German Academy of Natural Scientists during the second century of its existence. Friedrich Frommann, Jena 1860, p. 197
- Willi Ule: With a look back at the earlier period of its existence. On commission from Wilhelm Engelmann in Leipzig, Halle 1889, supplements and additions to the history of Neigebaur, p. 151
