= Kilian Stobæus =

Swedish physician (1690–1742)

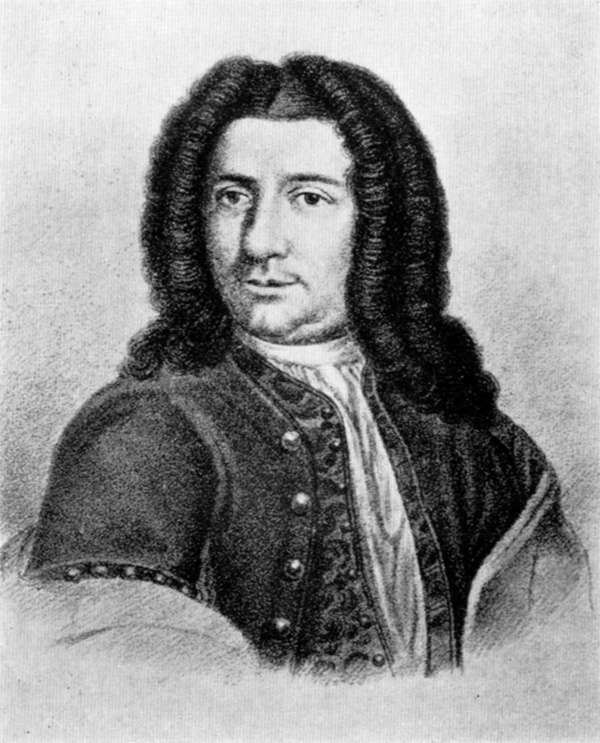
- 1735 painting of Kilian Stobæus. Credit: Carl Mörth
- Born: 6 February 1690; Vinslöv, Sweden
- Died: 17 February 1742 (aged 52); Lund, Sweden
- Education: Lund University
- Occupations: Physician, natural scientist, historian
- Spouse: Florentina Schubert (m. 1725)

Kilian Stobæus (6 February 1690 – 17 February 1742) was a Swedish physician, natural scientist, and historian. He offered a young Carl Linnaeus tutoring and lodging, as well as the use of his library, which included many books about botany. He also gave the student free admission to his lectures. In his spare time, Linnaeus explored the flora of Scania together with students sharing the same interests.

== Life ==
Stobæus was born 6 February 1690 in Vinslöv, Sweden. He was the son of Nils Stobæus and nephew of professor Andreas Stobæus. Although he was born in the province of Scania, Stobæus grew up with an uncle in Gothenburg. In 1725 he married Florentina Schubert, the daughter of a hat maker in Lund. Stobæus died 17 February 1742 in Lund.

== Medical career ==
In 1709 he became a student at Lund University, where he was promoted to doctor of medicine in 1721. Johan Jacob Döbelius was his mentor there. In December of the same year he was appointed to lead Döbelius' professorship, which he did until the end of 1723. In 1724, he became city physician in Gothenburg, but the following year he returned to Lund at the request of the Scanian nobility and the magistrate in Malmö and on the guarantee of an annual fee. As a doctor he provided free medication to the ill and poor.

== Academic work ==
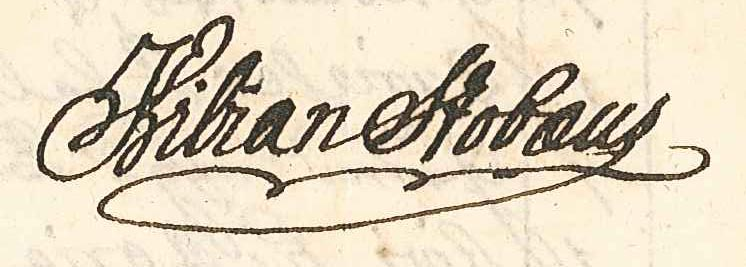
Stobæus' signature, 1733.

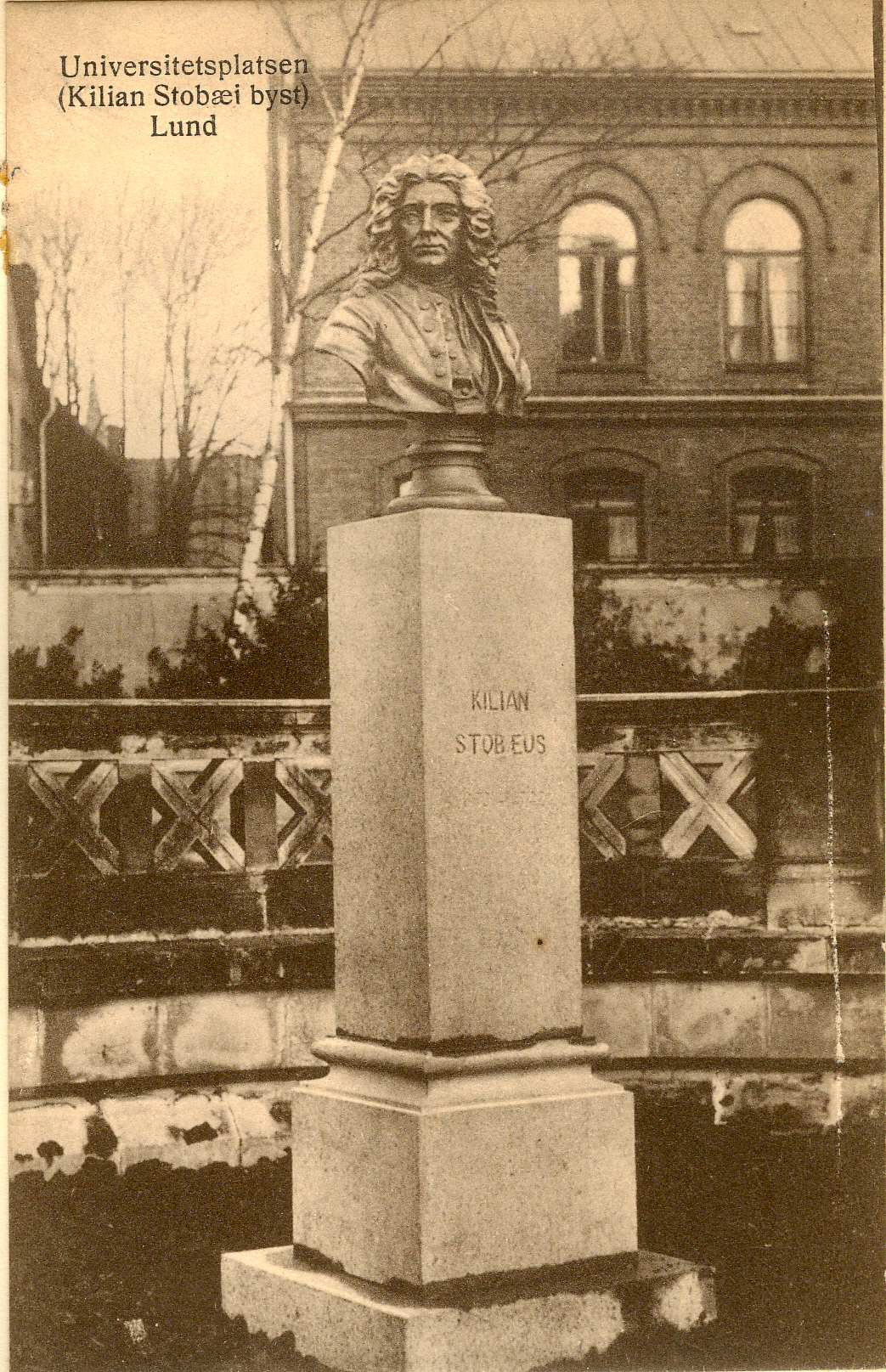
Bust of Stobæus at Universitetsplatsen i Lund, made by Walter Runeberg.

In 1728 Stobæus became an additional full professor of Philosophia naturalis et physica experimentalis (natural history and physics), a post he replaced in 1732 with the full professorship of history. He was also given the title of archiater the same year, and he continued to practice medicine extensively during his time as professor of history, including as doctor at the Ramlösa mineral spa, and tutoring young physicians.

As a teacher, writer and collector, Stobæus was prominent. With the exception of Andreas Rydelius, none of his contemporary university professors enjoyed the same public esteem. He was considered an excellent physician and scientist from the scientific point of view of his time. Stobæus aroused in his disciples a desire for scientific work by approaching them personally and showing them the paths of study and research. In his private residence in Lund, he provided free accommodation for a number of students, including the young Carl Linnaeus, who was granted access to Stobæus' private library. Among Stobæus' other students and disciples were Nils Rosén von Rosenstein, Johan Leche and Sven Lagerbring.

== Research ==
In the natural sciences, Stobæus was particularly interested in the study of fossils. In the field of history, his activities were significant, especially in the broader direction he introduced in his teaching, in that he not only addressed ancient and general history, as his predecessors had done, but also lectured on Swedish history and gave instruction in source research, on ancient monuments, and in numismatics. In 1735 he donated his considerable collections of natural objects and archaeological objects to Lund University, thereby laying the foundations not only for its natural history museum (which for a long time bore the name Museum Stobaænum, and which developed into the Lund University Zoological Museum), but also for its archaeological collections (now the Lund University Historical Museum). In 1745 his wife donated his numismatic collection to Lund University.

== Authorship ==
Stobæus published a large number of scientific publications, partly in the form of dissertations, partly in the series Acta Literaria Sueciae. The most important of these were collected and reprinted in 1752–1753 in Danzig under the title Kiliani Stobæi opuscula, in quibus petrefactorum, numismatum et antiquitatum historia illustratur. In addition, several unprinted writings by Stobæus are kept in the Lund University Library.

== Student nation activity ==
As a student, Stobæus had belonged to the student nation Gothenburg nation in Lund and was also its kurator in 1717. As a professor, however, he spent the last years of his life (1739–1742) as inspektor of the Scanian nation.

In 1906, a bust of Stobæus (sculpted by Walter Runeberg) was erected on the university square in Lund. This now forms, every year on the first of May, the meeting point for a student society, the Kilian & C:o Orden. One of the sons of Stobæus' cousin, by the same name – Kilian Stobæus the Younger (1717–1792) – also became a professor in Lund in obstetrics.
