= Lorenzo Fratellini =

Italian painter

Lorenzo Fratellini (1690s-1729) was a painter of the late-Baroque period. Also known as Lorenzo Maria Fratellini. Born in Florence, Grand Duchy of Tuscany, his mother Giovanna Fratellini was renowned for painting miniature portraits. Like his mother, he trained under Antonio Domenico Gabbiani. He specialized as a still life and vedute painter.
