= Lorenzo Zavateri =

Italian baroque violinist and composer

Lorenzo Gaetano Zavateri (8 September 1690 – 1764) was an Italian baroque violinist and composer.

Zavateri was born in Bologna, Papal States, where he studied composition and the violin. He was elected to Bologna's famous Accademia Filarmonica in 1717. During the 1720s he joined the esteemed orchestra of San Petronio. His compositions start to show the galante style of the late baroque and early classical eras.

== Works, editions and recordings ==
- Zavateri Concerti da chiesa e da camera Freiburg Baroque Orchestra dir. Gottfried von der Goltz. DHM.
