= Benjamin Elbel =

German Franciscan moral theologian

Benjamin Elbel (16 March 1690 – 4 June 1756) was a German Franciscan moral theologian.

Elbel was born at Friedberg, Bavaria. He belonged to the Strasburg Franciscan province, was lector of theology, and held high positions in the order. He died at Söflingen.

== Works ==
His major work, "Theologia moralis decalogalis et sacramentalis" (Venice, 1731), passed rapidly through several editions. A new edition was prepared by Irenaeus Bierbaum, under the title "Theologia moralis per modum conferentiarum auctore clarissime P. Benjamin Elbel..." (3 vols., Paderborn, 1891–92).

Elbel advocated probabilism. He applied abstract principles to strikingly practical cases, and his approach proved influential.
