= Allegory of Wealth =

Painting by Simon Vouet

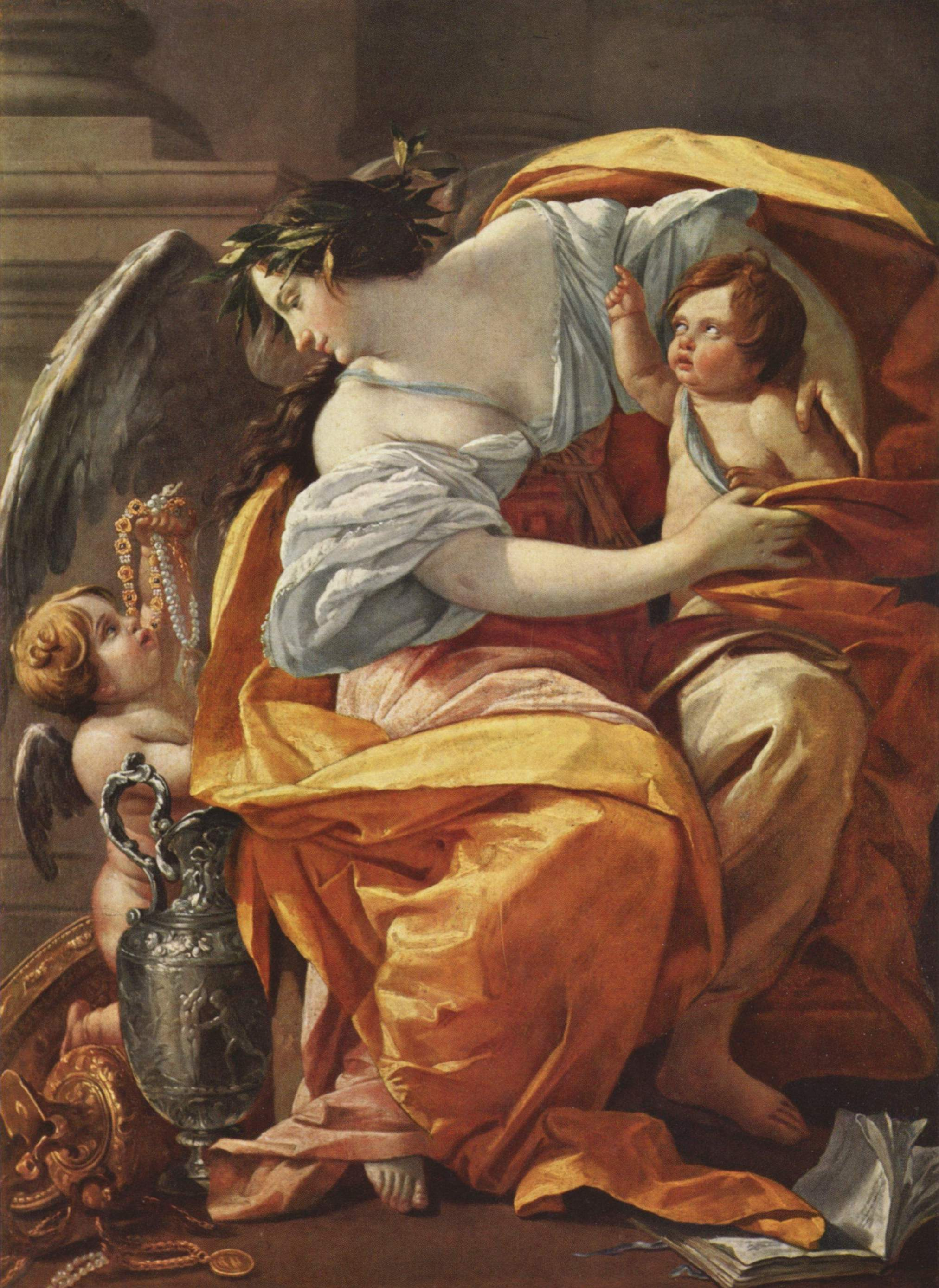
Allegory of Wealth (c. 1640) by Simon Vouet

Allegory of Wealth is a circa 1640 painting by the French Baroque artist Simon Vouet. Allegory of Wealth is its traditional title, though Nicolas Milovanovic argues that it should instead be entitled Allegory of Contempt for Wealth and the Louvre (where it now hangs) entitles it Allegory of Faith and of Contempt for Wealth.

Probably painted for Louis XIII's château at Saint-Germain-en-Laye, it is first mentioned in the French royal collection inventories early in the 18th century as Victory crowned with laurels holding in her arms an infant with a sash and an infant holding bracelets and precious stones. Frédéric Villot entitled it La Richesse in the mid-19th century and this title was not contested until 2015.

== Sources ==
- (in French) Nicolas Milovanovic, Simon Vouet et le Mépris des richesses in "Grande Galerie - Le Journal du Louvre", sept./oct./nov. 2015, n° 33, pp 40–41.
