= Wollaton =

Suburb of Nottingham, England

Coordinates: 52.953°N 1.221°W

- Suburb
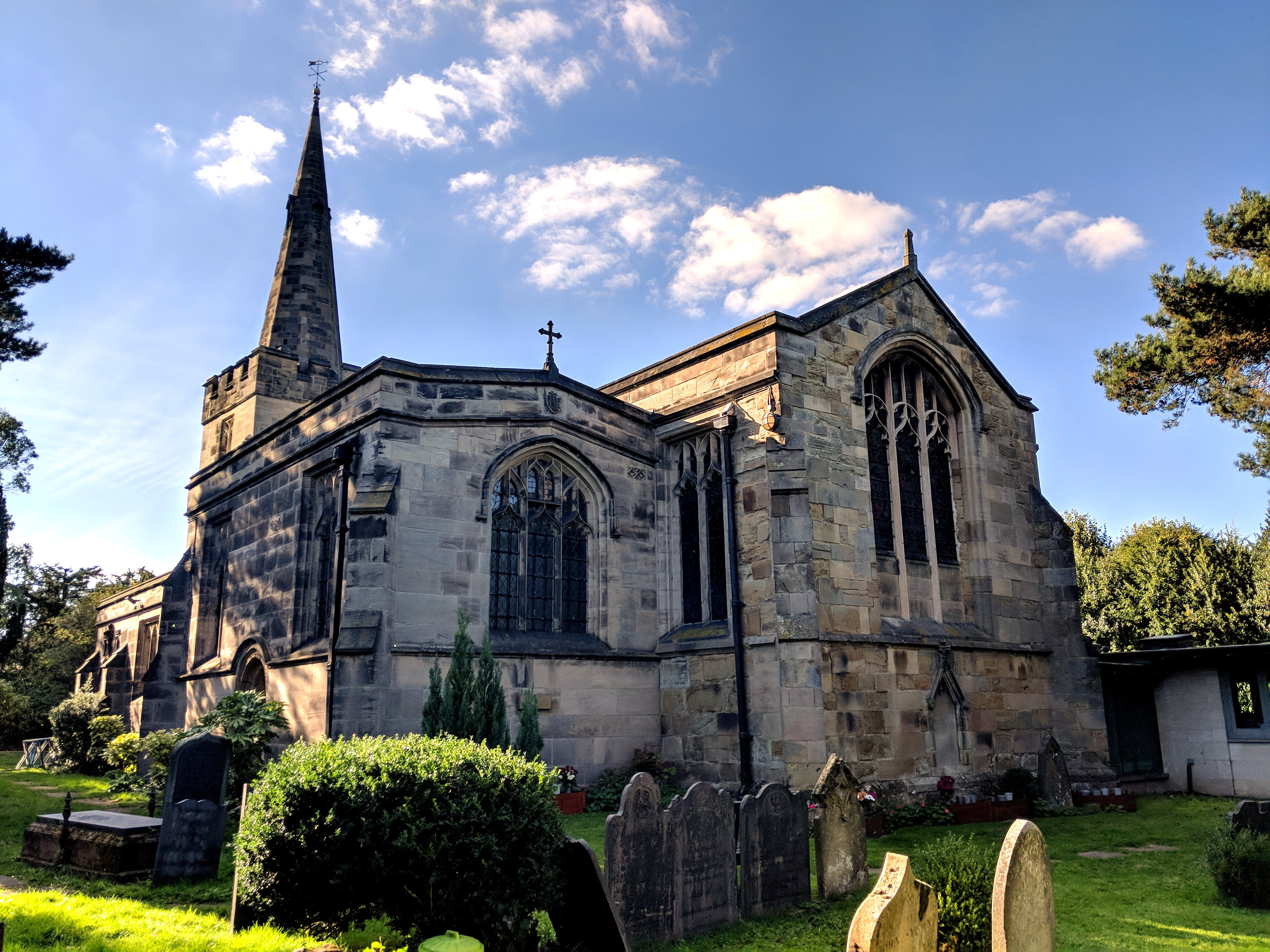
- St Leonard’s Church

- Location within Nottinghamshire
- Population: 24,693 (2xwards. 2011)
- OS grid reference: SK 52322 39838
- District: City of Nottingham Borough of Broxtowe (small part)
- Shire county: Nottinghamshire
- Region: East Midlands
- Country: England
- Sovereign state: United Kingdom
- Post town: NOTTINGHAM
- Postcode district: NG8
- Dialling code: 0115
- Police: Nottinghamshire
- Fire: Nottinghamshire
- Ambulance: East Midlands
- UK Parliament: Nottingham South

Wollaton is a suburb and former civil parish in the western part of Nottingham and small part of Wollaton falls within Broxtowe, in Nottingham city area, in the ceremonial county of Nottinghamshire, England. Wollaton has two wards in the City of Nottingham (Wollaton East & Lenton Abbey and Wollaton West), with a total population of 24,693 at the 2011 census. It is home to Wollaton Hall, with its museum, deer park, lake, walks and golf course.

== History ==
The remains of Roman kilns, crematoria and coins have been found in Wollaton.

The centre of Wollaton village, the original heart of the suburb, has remained relatively unchanged over the past few hundred years and is dominated by the Admiral Rodney public house and the Anglican church of St Leonard dating back to the 13th century. It also features historic cottages, an Elizabethan dovecote and a water pump. In 1931 the parish had a population of 1796. On 1 April 1933 the parish was abolished and merged with Nottingham. Most areas of the former parish were built-up by the end of the 1960s.

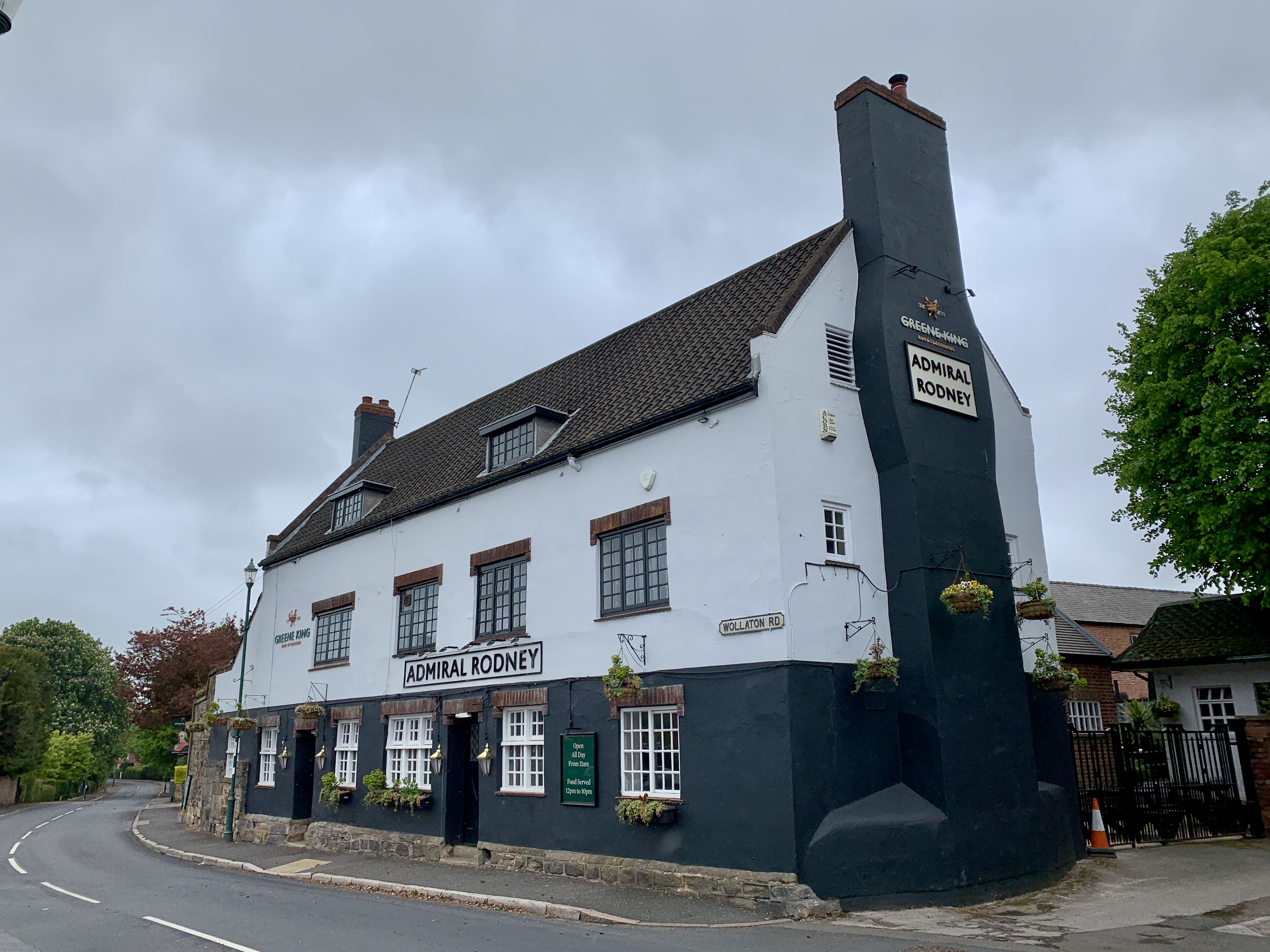
Admiral Rodney

== Geography ==
Wollaton proper is entirely situated in the City of Nottingham, although a small part of the Broxtowe borough may be referred to as Wollaton by local people. Other areas of Nottingham which were not in the original parish of Wollaton may also be described as Wollaton, notably those parts of the former parish of Radford known historically as Radford Woodhouses, and the part of Wollaton Park which was used for housing (usually called the Wollaton Park Estate) which was primarily in the former parish of Lenton.

Wollaton itself stretches across a large area, from Torvill Drive and Russell Drive near the Bilborough area in the north, down to Bramcote Lane, Woodbank Drive and Appledore Avenue in the south, stretching as far south as the woodland now called 'Bramcote Ridge'. West to east it stretches from Trowell Moor and Balloon Woods on the west, across to Sutton Passeys Crescent and the former gatehouse to Wollaton Park, Lenton Lodge on Derby Road in the east.

The current city ward boundaries divide Wollaton into Wollaton West, and Wollaton East with Lenton Abbey.

It is considered one of the most desirable parts of the city to live in, with relatively high house prices. This is largely due to the good quality schools (although getting a place is troublesome), traditional public houses and good access to the M1 via the A52 to the South and the A610 to the North.

Wollaton is home to the Torvill and Dean estate, on the former site of Wollaton Colliery and Canal. Road names include Torvill Drive, Jayne Close, Bolero Close (named after their gold medal-winning performance song, Boléro), and Crawford Close (named after Michael Crawford who assisted Torvill and Dean in developing their winning dance). Another famous Nottingham sport man, swimmer Tom Blower, also has his name adopted by a street in Wollaton (although he came from Hyson Green).

== Education ==
The local Middleton Primary and Nursery School along with Fernwood Primary and Nursery School and Fernwood School are some of the better performing state schools within Nottingham City. The three Fernwood schools are the a family of academies all within close proximity. Fernwood school has secured funding to expand by 450 additional school places in 2018 with work starting in 2019. The School has an Ofsted 'Outstanding' rating, and is massively oversubscribed every year, with 2019 being the schools best GCSE results ever. With a number of new housing developments being planned in Wollaton (the old Siemens Factory and the site of the now closed Middletons Pub these extra pupil spaces will be needed. Fernwood Comprehensive also was where British actress Vicki McClure studied. Fernwood Primary and Nursery school has an Ofsted 'Good' rating; it achieved this in June 2019. Another secondary school in the area is Bluecoat Wollaton Academy.

The nearest sixth form college for post-16 education is Bilborough College in Bilborough. Also in and around Wollaton are Southwold Primary School and Firbeck Academy, a school for the deaf and aurally impaired.

== Amenities ==
The edge of Wollaton is also home to the Martin's Pond Local Nature Reserve which is jointly maintained by Nottingham City Council and Nottinghamshire Wildlife Trust. The lake is maintained by Wollaton Piscatorial Club which provides a haven for plant and animal life and a wide variety of coarse fishing (including some rarer species).

The area is also home to Wollaton Library which a few years ago underwent a £250,000 refurbishment to form a new children's library and extend meeting facilities, the works were carried out by Nottingham city council and completed by local contractor GPS Construction (Nottingham) ltd

=== Wollaton Park ===
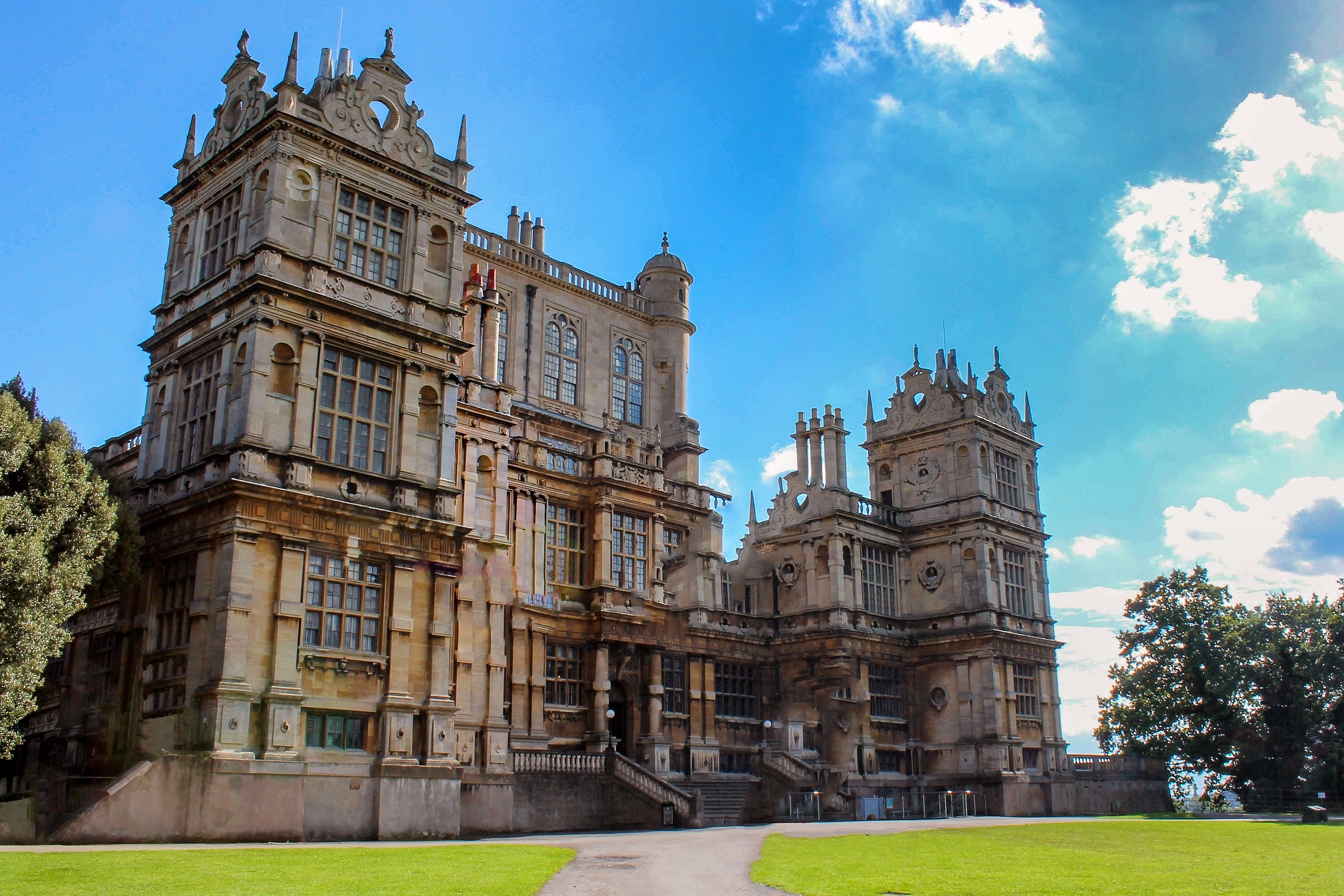
Wollaton Hall in Wollaton Park

Wollaton Park is a Grade II listed 500-acre park in Nottingham, England, which includes a deer park. It is centred on Wollaton Hall, a classic Elizabethan prodigy house which contains the Nottingham Natural History Museum, with the Nottingham Industrial Museum in the stable block. It has also been host to many large events and concerts, including the once annual City in the Park events which ran during the 1990s and featured popular pop acts of the time such as Peter Andre, Five, Gina G and The Bangles. A new festival, Splendour in Nottingham, was relaunched in 2008 and is slowly developing into a popular festival, with large names such as Calvin Harris and The Pet Shop Boys performing there in 2010, and Dizzee Rascal in 2012. The park also hosts the city's annual War Veterans Memorial Weekend, being one of the largest memorial events outside London and including fly-overs by wartime aircraft. Also, the park hosts other major annual events such as cross-county running championships, dog shows, steam shows and the annual Nottingham Motor Show. The Park is also where the sledgers of Nottingham descend whenever there is snowfall, taking advantage of the park's large hill.

Wollaton Hall also appeared as Wayne Manor in the 2012 film The Dark Knight Rises.

== Transport ==
=== Railways ===
Wollaton is also noted for the existence of one of the earliest recorded railway lines in the world, the Wollaton Wagonway. The wagonway ran between nearby Strelley and Wollaton. Horse-drawn coal wagons travelled to their destination on wooden railway lines.

The wagonway was completed in 1604, built by Huntingdon Beaumont working in partnership with the second occupier of Wollaton Hall, Sir Percival Willoughby.

Wollaton does not have a railway station, even though the line from Nottingham to the Erewash Valley line passes through the area.

=== Bus services ===
Nottingham City Transport

■ 30: Nottingham → Ilkeston Road → Jubilee Campus → Wollaton Park → Bramcote → Wollaton Vale

■ 35: Nottingham → Derby Road → QMC → University Park → Wollaton Vale → Bilborough → Strelley → Bulwell

■ 35A: Nottingham → Derby Road → QMC → University Park → Wollaton Vale

■ 35B: Nottingham → Derby Road → QMC → University Park → Wollaton Vale → Bilborough → Strelley

Trentbarton

■ two: Nottingham → Wollaton → Trowell → Ilkeston → Cotmanhay

Nottingham Community Transport

■ L2: Nottingham → QMC → Wollaton → Nottingham Business Park → Assarts Farm

== Churches ==
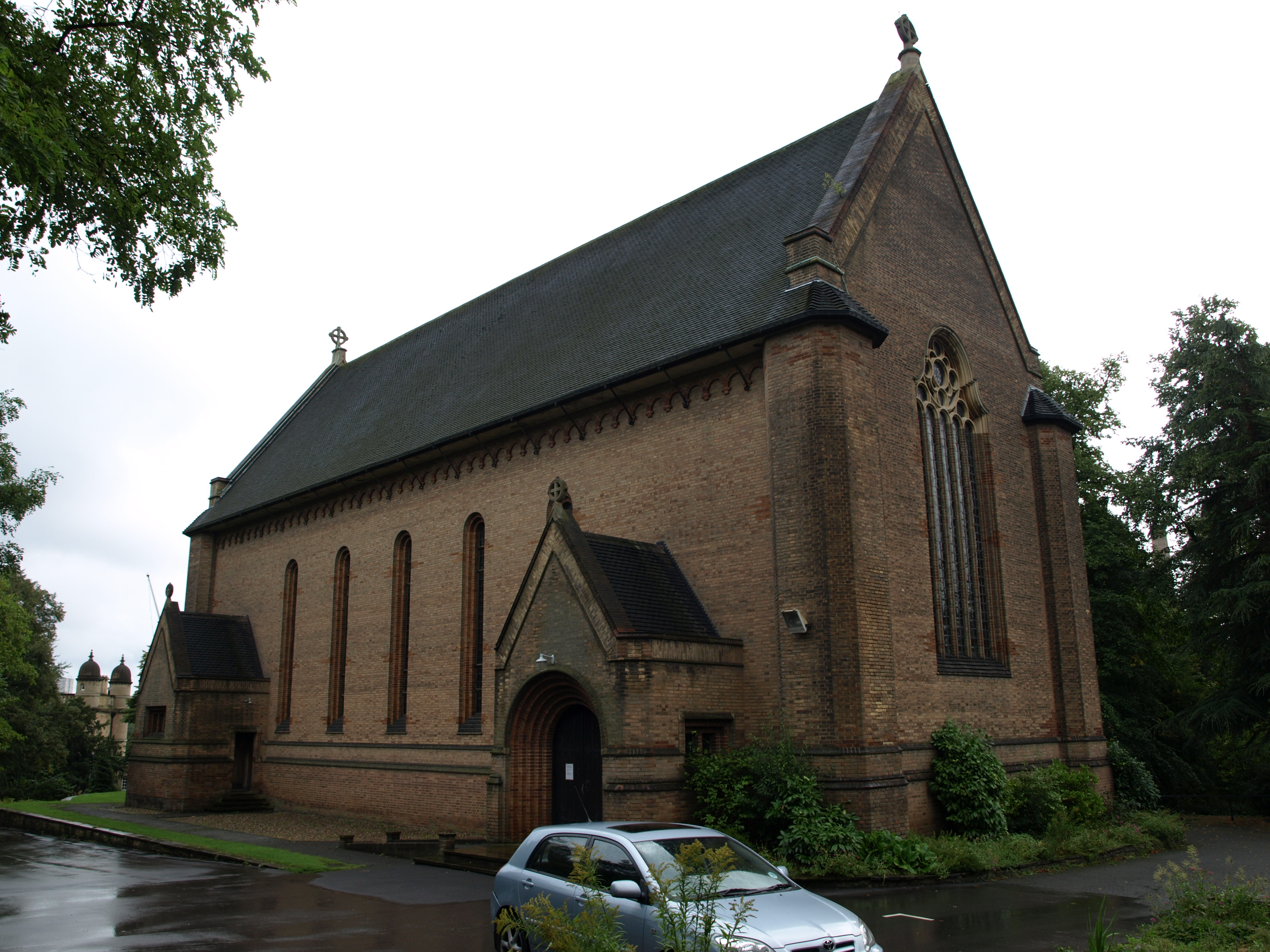
St. Mary's Church

There are five churches in Wollaton:

- St. Leonard's Parish Church
- St. Mary's Church
- Grangewood Methodist Church
- St. Thomas More's Roman Catholic Church
- Kingswood Methodist Church

The churches jointly publish a monthly magazine, Link.

== Museums ==
- Industrial Museum in Wollaton Park's courtyard
- Natural History Museum in Wollaton Hall
- Wollaton Village Dovecote Museum is a little-known museum on Dovecote Drive. The dovecote was built in circa 1565 by the Willoughby family.

== Commerce and industry ==
Employment today is primarily in the service, university and public sectors, with many of the local residents commuting to work in the Nottingham and Derby area.

=== Mining ===
Coal has always been an important presence in the suburb and revenue from Wollaton Colliery was a major source of income to the Willoughby family, who built and owned Wollaton Hall up until the 20th century. The colliery closed after in 1965.

=== Retail economy ===
The suburb's main shopping area is located along Bramcote Lane about a kilometre west of the historic centre. Also in Wollaton are a small cluster of shops at the Crown Island (a major roundabout nearer the Nottingham city centre) which includes a post office and various food establishments.

== Sport and recreation ==
=== Local football ===
==== WHYFC ====
Wollaton Hall and Bramcote Football Club (founded 1984) is a FA Charter Standard Club. Formerly based at Wollaton Park, the club is now based at Trinity School in Aspley. Some of WH&BFC teams play their home games at Highfields Sports Ground with facilities also in use at nearby Moor Lane, Bramcote. Most teams train at Fernwood Comprehensive School or Trinity. The club currently has over 300 registered players and teams compete in the Notts Ladies & Girls League, the Young Elizabethan League, Notts Youth League and Derby City League.

==== WFC ====
Wollaton FC were formed in 1954 and play at Wollaton Sports Association Ground sharing the ground with Wollaton Cricket Club. The club is sited on land that was sold to the village for sports and recreational activities by the Middleton family just after the 2nd World War. The Club Badge depicts the Elizabethan architecture of Wollaton Hall. Originally in the Midland Amateur Alliance, Wollaton joined the Notts Alliance in 1990. The club enjoyed a long and successful spell in the MAA and the 3rd and 4th teams still play in that League. Season 2004/5 saw Wollaton become one of the founder members of the Notts Senior League.

== See also ==
- Listed buildings in Nottingham (Wollaton West ward)
- Friends of Wollaton Park
- Wollaton Historical & Conservation Society
