= St Leonard's Church, Wollaton =

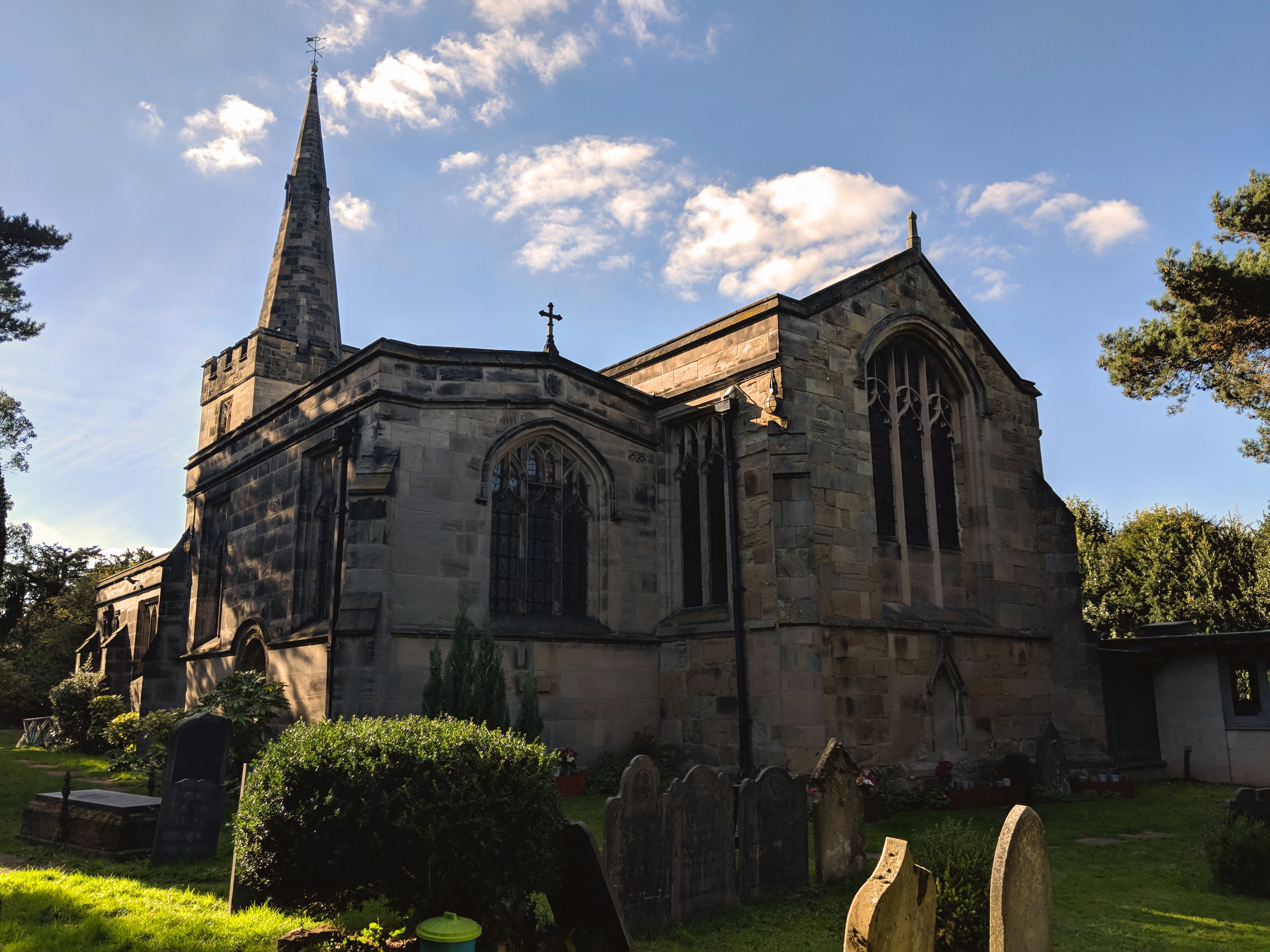
- St Leonard's Church, Wollaton
- St Leonard's Church, Wollaton
- 52°57′11″N 01°13′10″W
- Denomination: Church of England
- Churchmanship: Broad Church
- Website: www.stleonardswollaton.org.uk St Leonard's Church

History
- Dedication: St. Leonard

Administration
- Province: York
- Diocese: Southwell and Nottingham
- Parish: Wollaton

Clergy
- Rector: Revd. Canon Tim Pullen

St Leonard's Church is a Church of England parish church in Wollaton, Nottinghamshire, England. Dating originally from the 13th century, the church was restored in the Victorian era and again in the 20th century. It is notable for the large number of funerary monuments it contains. Many are to the Willoughby family, of nearby Wollaton Hall. There is also a memorial to Robert Smythson, designer of the hall, and one of the first English architects. The church is a Grade II* listed building.

== History ==
St. Leonard's dates from at least the early 13th century, the chancel being the earliest part, with the nave and tower dating from the 14th century. The Wollaton Antiphonal was in use in the church from the 1460s. The church has a long connection with the Willoughby family of Wollaton Hall who were the patrons of the parish. Monuments to the family, including a tomb chest and effigies to Henry Willoughby and his wives.

== Clock ==
In 1892 the old clock which was described as being of a great age and entirely worn out was replaced by a turret clock built by Potts of Leeds. This new clock had a double three-legged gravity escapement as invented by Lord Grimthorpe The time was shown on cast iron skeleton glazed with white opal glass which was illuminated by gas lamps at night.

The clock mechanism was replaced in 1991 when the Potts clock was given to Leeds Industrial Museum.

== Memorials ==
The church contains an "exceptional number" of memorials. These include:

- Richard Willoughby who died in 1471
- Henry Willoughby of 1528
- Henry Willoughby, 5th Baron Middleton 1800
- Henry Willoughby, 6th Baron Middleton 1835
- Robert Smythson - his monument describes him as "Gent., Architector and Survayor" and is possibly by Smythson's son, John.

== See also ==
- Grade II* listed buildings in Nottinghamshire
- Listed buildings in Nottingham (Wollaton West ward)

== Sources ==
- Hartwell, Clare; Pevsner, Nikolaus; Williamson, Elizabeth (2020) [1951]. Nottinghamshire. The Buildings of England. New Haven, US and London: Yale University Press. ISBN 978-0300-24783-1. OCLC 1225899706.
- Harwood, Elain (2010). Nottingham. Pevsner Architectural Guides. New Haven, US and London: Yale University Press. ISBN 978-0-300-12666-2. OCLC 889922548.
