= Henry Willoughby, 6th Baron Middleton =

English Baron and nobleman

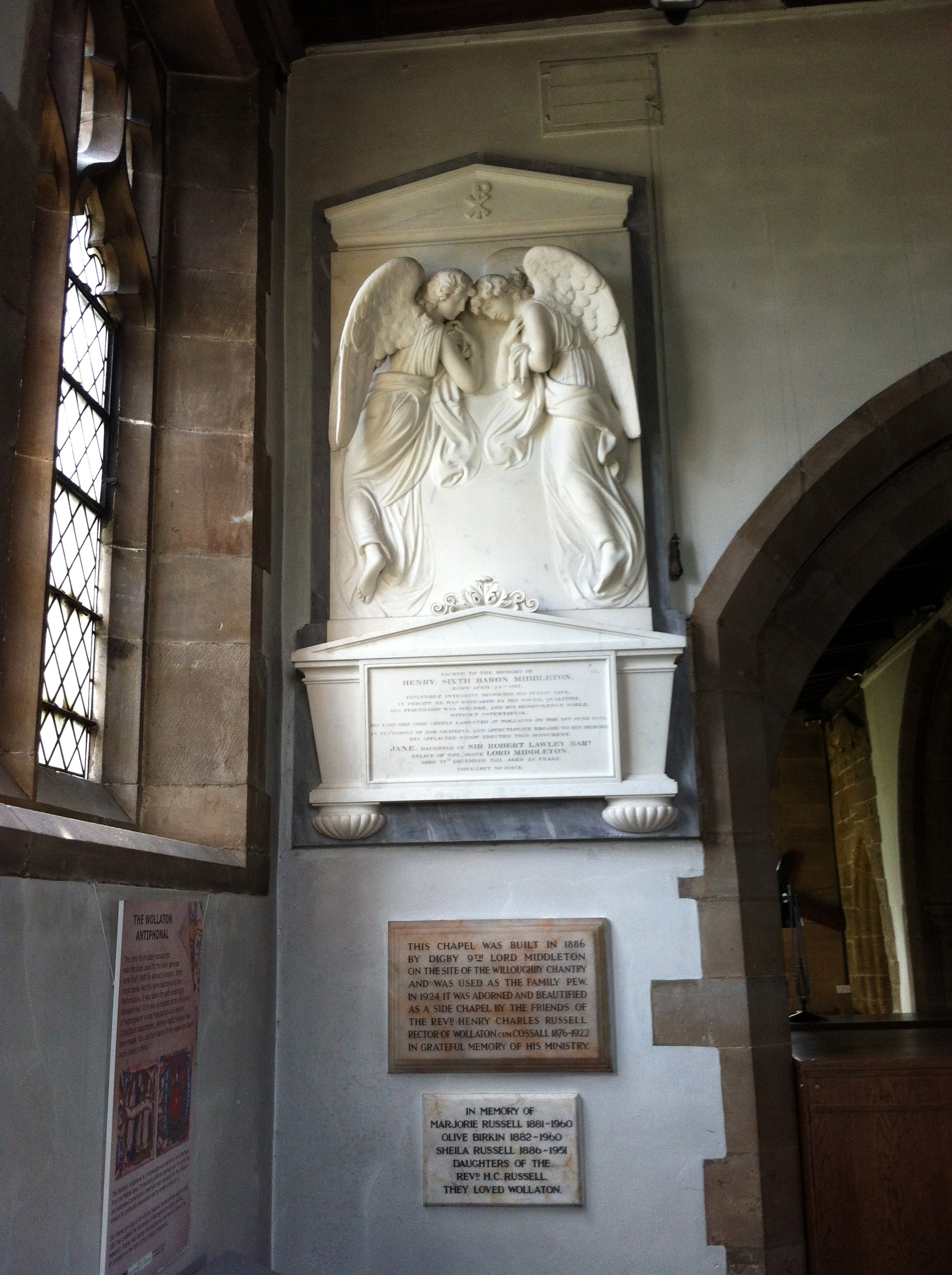
The memorial in St. Leonard's Church, Wollaton to Henry, 6th Baron Middleton

Henry Willoughby, 6th Baron Middleton (24 April 1761 – 19 June 1835), was an English nobleman, the only son of Henry Willoughby, 5th Baron Middleton.

He married Jane Lawley, daughter of Sir Robert Lawley, 5th Baronet, and lived in the family seat at Wollaton Park, Nottinghamshire, which he had extensively remodeled under the direction of Sir Jeffry Wyattville.

Lord Middleton was a keen fox hunter and was a regular follower of the Warwickshire Hunt. In 1811, he purchased the pack from the hunt's founder John Corbet, for 1,200 guineas. He remained the hunt's Master until 1821, when following a fall from his favourite horse Billy Button, he passed on the mastership to Evelyn Shirley of Ettington Hall.

Lord Middleton had no legitimate children. He was believed to have been the father of Rev Henry Charles Knight (1813–1887), the son of Hon. Frances Knight, who had long been separated from her husband Robert Knight. In 1823, he arranged for an annuity of £800 a year to be paid to her.

Lord Middleton's memorial is in St. Leonard's Church, Wollaton.

Honorary titles
Preceded by The 4th Earl of Aylesford	High Steward of Sutton Coldfield; 1812–1835	Succeeded by The 5th Earl of Aylesford
Peerage of Great Britain
Preceded by Henry Willoughby	Baron Middleton; 1800–1835	Succeeded by Digby Willoughby
