= Fernwood School, Nottingham =

The Fernwood School

Location
- Goodwood Road; Wollaton; Nottingham, Nottinghamshire, NG8 2FT; England
- Coordinates: 52.95348°N 1.23016°W

Information
- Type: Academy
- Motto: High Achievement with Care and Discipline for All
- Department for Education URN: 136724 Tables
- Ofsted: Reports
- Headteacher: Chris Gell
- Gender: Coeducational
- Age: 11 to 16
- Enrolment: 1,050
- Website: http://www.fernwoodschool.org.uk

The Fernwood School is an academy based in Wollaton, Nottingham, Nottinghamshire, England.

It was previously known as Fernwood Comprehensive School.

In 2018 it was granted funding to expand its enrollment to include an additional 450 pupils.
