= Wollaton Hall =

Historic house museum in Nottingham, England

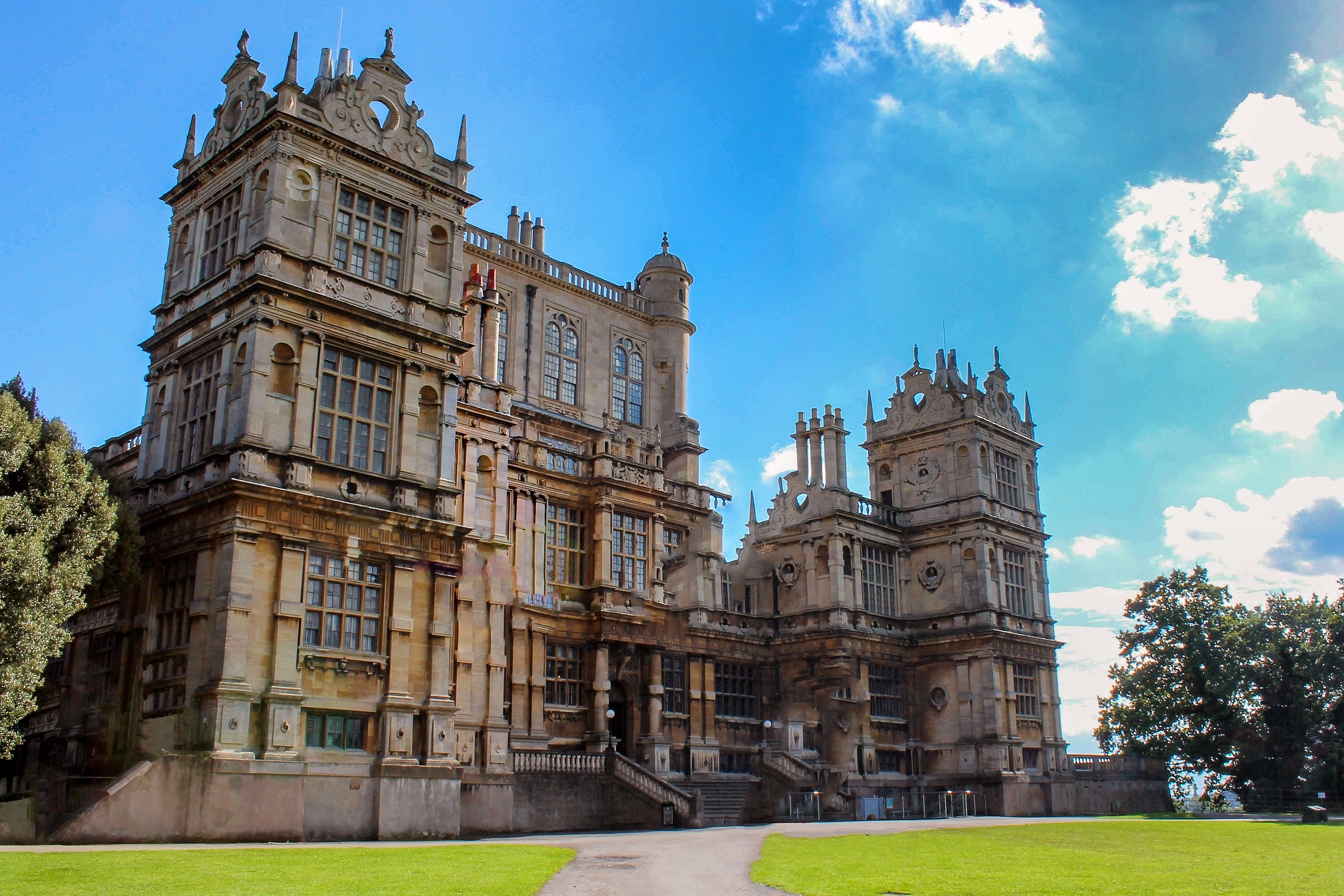
- The hall from the front

- Location within Nottinghamshire
- 52°56′53″N 1°12′35″W
- Type: Prodigy house
- Location: Nottingham, NG8 2AE

History
- Built: 1580–1588
- Built for: Sir Francis Willoughby

Site notes
- Architect: Robert Smythson
- Architectural style: Elizabethan
- Owner: Nottingham City Council
- Website: wollatonhall.org.uk

Listed Building – Grade I
- Official name: Wollaton Hall
- Designated: 11 August 1952
- Reference no.: 1255269

Listed Building – Grade II*
- Official name: Camellia House 100 Metres South West of Wollaton Hall
- Designated: 12 July 1972
- Reference no.: 1255271

Listed Building – Grade II*
- Official name: Doric Temple and Attached Bridge 200 Metres South-East of Wollaton Hall
- Designated: 10 August 1989
- Reference no.: 1270389

National Register of Historic Parks and Gardens
- Official name: Wollaton Hall
- Designated: 1 January 1986
- Reference no.: 1000344

Wollaton Hall is an Elizabethan country house of the 1580s standing on a small but prominent hill in Wollaton Park, Nottingham, England. The house is now Nottingham Natural History Museum, with Nottingham Industrial Museum in the outbuildings. The surrounding parkland has a herd of deer, and is regularly used for large-scale outdoor events such as rock concerts, sporting events and festivals.

== Wollaton and the Willoughbys ==
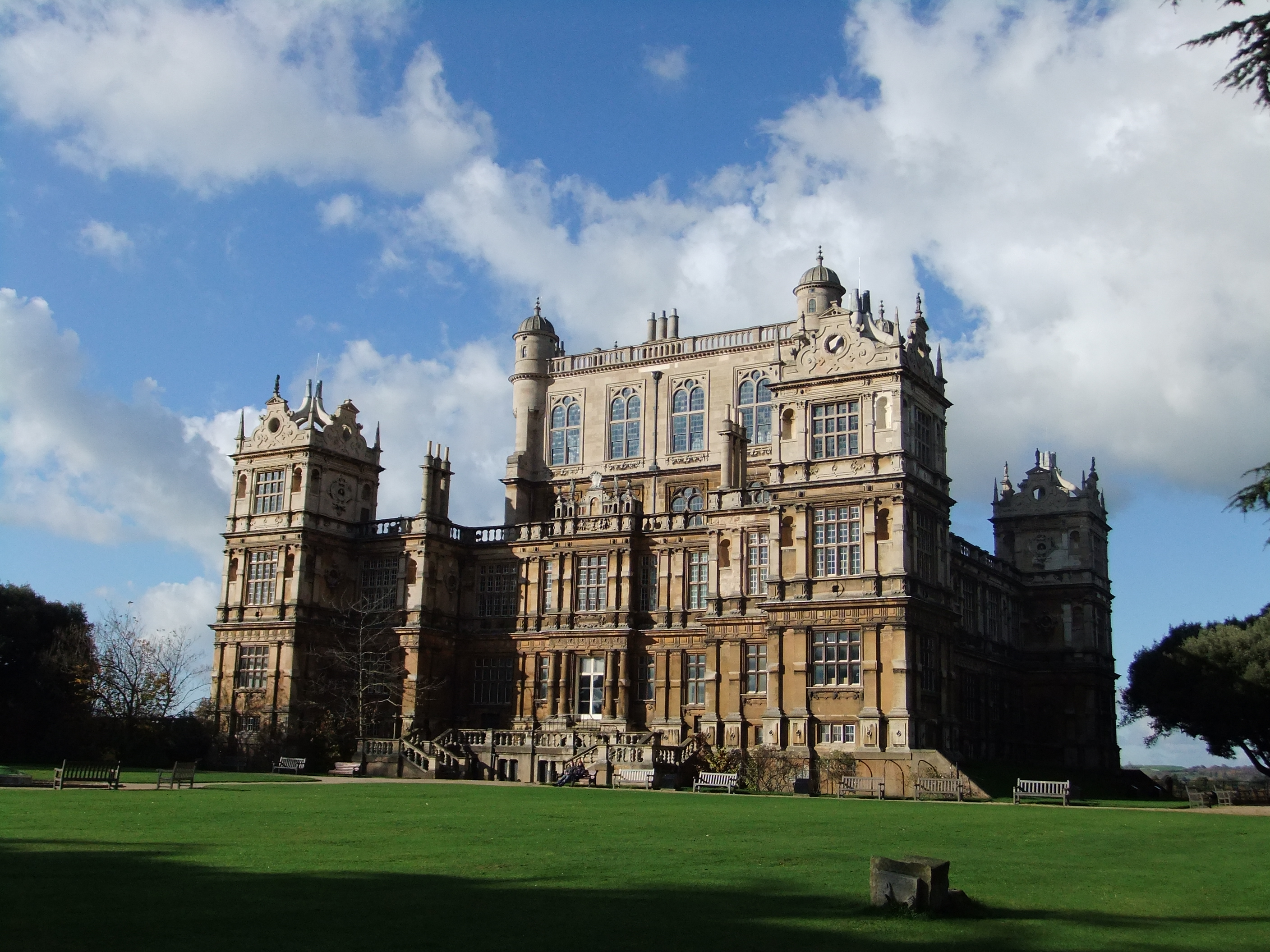
Wollaton Hall, rear view

Wollaton Hall was built between 1580 and 1588 for Sir Francis Willoughby and is believed to be designed by the Elizabethan architect, Robert Smythson, who had by then completed Longleat, and was to go on to design Hardwick Hall. The general plan of Wollaton is comparable to these, and was widely adopted for other houses, but the exuberant decoration of Wollaton is distinctive, and it is possible that Willoughby played some part in creating it. The style is an advanced Elizabethan with early Jacobean elements.

Wollaton is a classic prodigy house, "the architectural sensation of its age", though its builder was not a leading courtier and its construction stretched the resources he mainly obtained from coalmining; the original family home was at the bottom of the hill. Though much re-modelled inside, the "startlingly bold" exterior remains largely intact.

On 21 June 1603, Willoughby's son Sir Percival Willoughby hosted Anne of Denmark and her children Prince Henry and Princess Elizabeth at Wollaton. Charles, later Charles I, came in 1604.

== Description ==
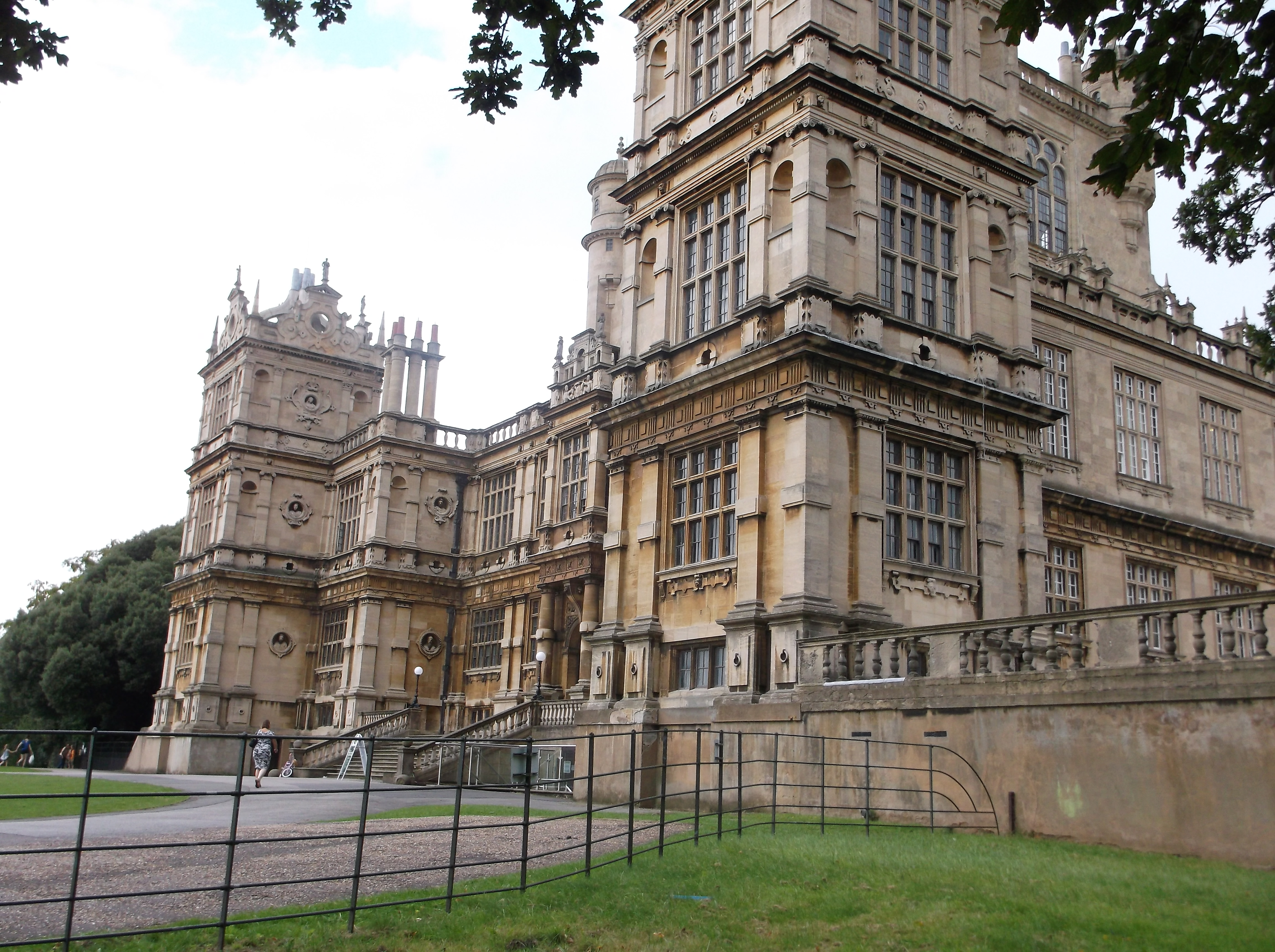
Oblique view of the main facade

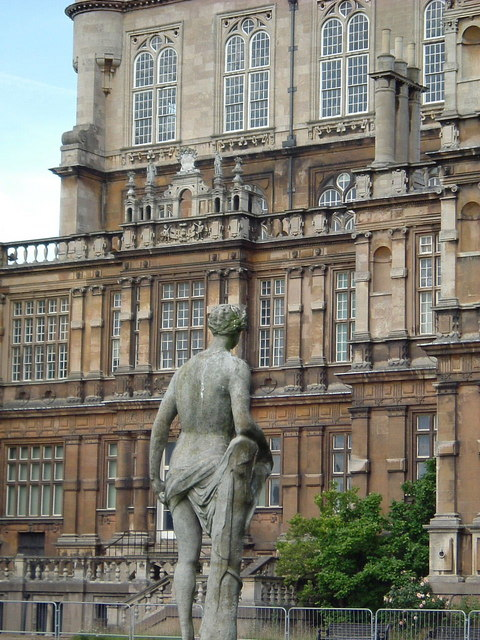
Oblique view from the rear

The building consists of a central block dominated by a hall three storeys high, with a stone screen at one end and galleries at either end, with the "Prospect Room" above that. From this there are extensive views of the park and surrounding country. There are towers at each corner, projecting out from this top floor. At each corner of the house is a square pavilion of three storeys, with decorative features rising above the roof line. Much of the basement storey is cut from the rock the house sits on.

The floor plan has been said to derive from Serlio's drawing (in Book III of his Five Books of Architecture) of Giuliano da Majano's Villa Poggio Reale near Naples of the late 15th century, with elevations derived from Hans Vredeman de Vries. The architectural historian Mark Girouard has suggested that the design is in fact derived from Nikolaus de Lyra's reconstruction, and Josephus's description, of Solomon's Temple in Jerusalem, with a more direct inspiration being the mid-16th century Mount Edgcumbe in Cornwall, which Smythson knew.

The building is of Ancaster stone from Lincolnshire, and is said to have been paid for with coal from the Wollaton pits owned by Willoughby; the labourers were also paid this way. Cassandra Willoughby, Duchess of Chandos recorded in 1702 that the master masons, and some of the statuary, were brought from Italy. The decorative gondola mooring rings carved in stone on the exterior walls offer some evidence of this, as do other architectural features. There are also obvious French and Dutch influences. The exterior and hall have extensive and busy carved decoration, featuring strapwork and a profusion of decorative forms. The window tracery of the upper floors in the central block and the general busyness of the decoration look back to the Middle Ages, and have been described as "fantasy-Gothic".

== Later history ==
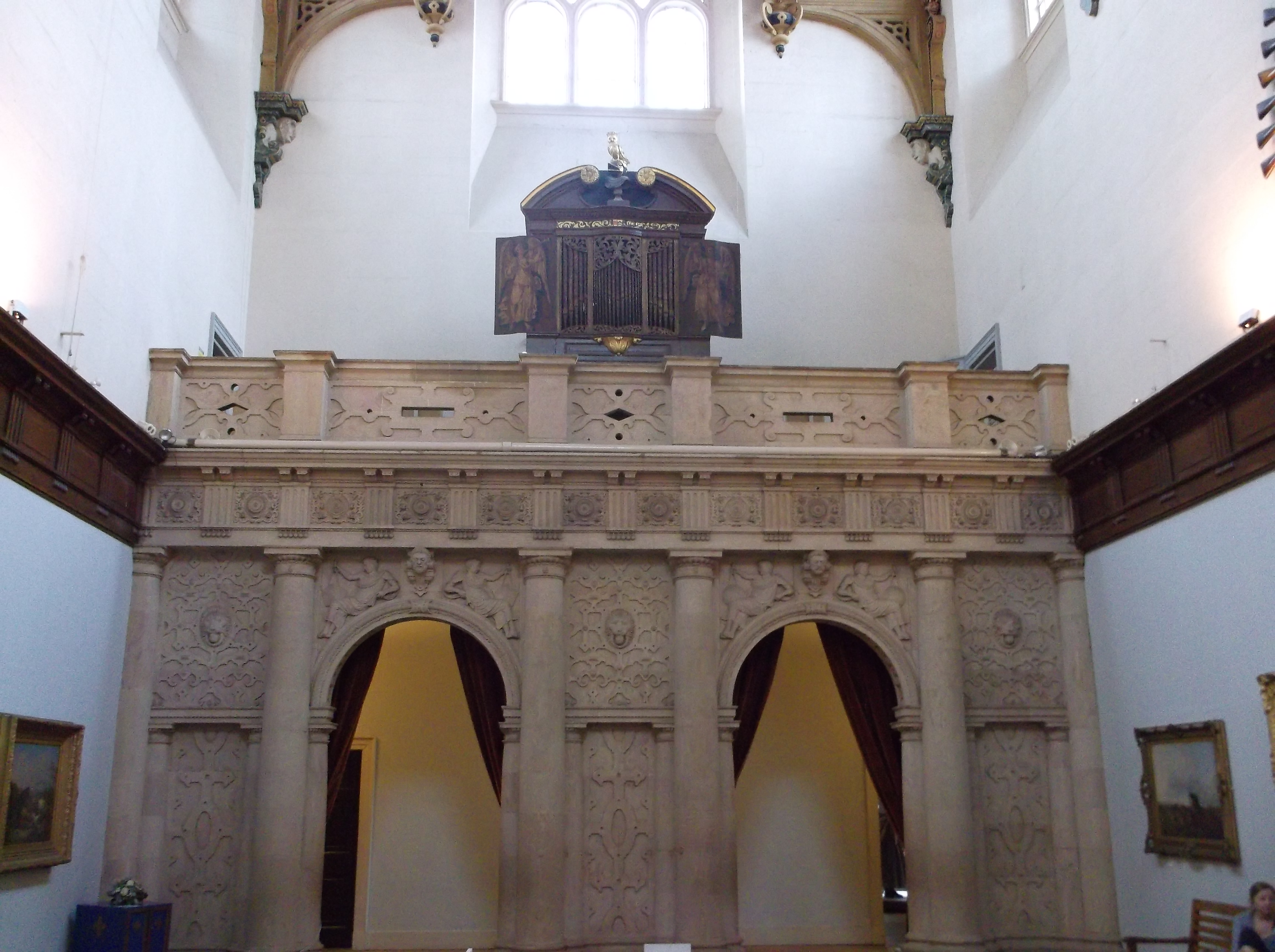
The screen in the hall

The house was unused for about four decades before 1687, following a fire in 1642, and then re-occupied and given the first of several campaigns of re-modelling of the interiors. Paintings on the ceilings of the two main staircases and round the walls of one are attributed to Sir James Thornhill and perhaps also Louis Laguerre, carried out around 1700. Re-modelling was carried out by Wyatville in 1801 and continued intermittently until the 1830s.

The hall remains essentially in its original Elizabethan state, with a "fake hammerbeam" wood ceiling of the 1580s, in fact supported by horizontal beams above, but given large and un-needed hammerbeams for decoration. The slightly earlier roofs of the great halls at Theobalds and Longleat were similar.

The gallery of the main hall contains Nottinghamshire's oldest pipe organ, thought to date from the end of the 17th century, possibly by the builder Gerard Smith. It is still blown by hand. Beneath the hall are many cellars and passages, and a well and associated reservoir tank, in which some accounts report that an admiral of the Willoughby family took a daily bath.

The Willoughbys were noted for the number of explorers they produced, most famously Sir Hugh Willoughby who died in the Arctic in 1554 attempting a North East passage to Cathay. Willoughby's Land is named after him.

In 1881, the house was still owned by the head of the Willoughby family, Digby Willoughby, 9th Baron Middleton, but by then it was "too near the smoke and busy activity of a large manufacturing town... now only removed from the borough by a narrow slip of country", so that the previous head of the family, Henry Willoughby, 8th Baron Middleton, had begun to let the house to tenants and in 1881 it was vacant.

Wollaton Hall was sold by the 11th Baron Middleton to the Nottingham Corporation for £200,000 (equivalent to £10.51 million in 2025). Estate and personal papers of the Willoughby family were used to create the Middleton collection at the department of Manuscripts and Special Collections, The University of Nottingham. They include the Wollaton Antiphonal and the single manuscript holding the 13th-century post-Arthurian romance Le Roman de Silence.

Nottingham Council opened the hall as a museum in 1926. In 2005 it was closed for a two-year refurbishment and re-opened in April 2007. The prospect room at the top of the house, and the kitchens in the basement, were opened up for the public to visit, though this must be done on one of the escorted tours. The latter can be booked on the day, lasts about an hour, and a small charge is made.

In 2011, key scenes from the Batman film The Dark Knight Rises were filmed outside Wollaton Hall. The Hall was featured as Wayne Manor. The Hall is five miles north of Gotham, Nottinghamshire, through which Gotham City indirectly got its name.

== Gardens ==
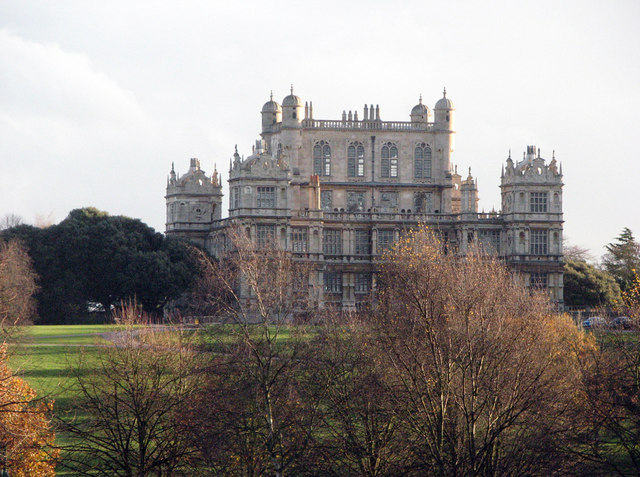
Wollaton Hall seen from inside the north entrance to the park on Wollaton Road.

Wollaton Hall Park is Grade II* listed on the Register of Historic Parks and Gardens.

The Camellia House is a listed building in its own right, as are many other buildings and structures, including a doric temple and Ha-Ha.

== Owners of Wollaton Hall ==
- 1580–1596: Sir Francis Willoughby
- 1596–1643: Sir Percival Willoughby
- 1643–1672: Francis Willoughby
- 1672–1729: Thomas Willoughby, 1st Baron Middleton
- 1729–1758: Francis Willoughby, 2nd Baron Middleton
- 1758–1774: Francis Willoughby, 3rd Baron Middleton
- 1774–1781: Thomas Willoughby, 4th Baron Middleton
- 1781–1800: Henry Willoughby, 5th Baron Middleton
- 1800–1835: Henry Willoughby, 6th Baron Middleton
- 1835–1856: Digby Willoughby, 7th Baron Middleton
- 1856–1877: Henry Willoughby, 8th Baron Middleton
- 1877–1922: Digby Wentworth Bayard Willoughby, 9th Baron Middleton
- 1922–1924: Godfrey Ernest Percival Willoughby, 10th Baron Middleton
- 1924–1925: Michael Guy Percival Willoughby, 11th Baron Middleton
- 1925–present: Nottingham Corporation now Nottingham City Council

== Similar buildings ==
In 1855, Joseph Paxton designed Mentmore Towers in Buckinghamshire, which borrows many features from Wollaton. Both properties have been used as film locations for Christopher Nolan's Batman trilogy of films, featuring as Wayne Manor – the latter in Batman Begins and Wollaton Hall itself in The Dark Knight Rises.

== Nottingham Natural History Museum ==
Since Wollaton Hall opened to the public in 1926, it has been home to the city's natural history museum. On display are some of the items from the three quarters of a million specimens that make up its zoology, geology, and botany collections. These are housed in six main galleries:

- Natural Connections Gallery
- Bird Gallery
- Insect Gallery
- Mineral Gallery
- Africa Gallery
- Natural History Matters Gallery

The museum started life as an interest group at the Nottingham Mechanics' Institution; it is now owned by the Nottingham City Council.

In 2017 the museum hosted a tour of dinosaur skeletons titled Dinosaurs of China, Ground Shakers to Feathered Flyers. The exhibition was attended by over 125,000 people.

From July 2021 to August 2022, the Nottingham Natural History Museum featured the world's first exhibit of Titus, a "real" Tyrannosaurus rex fossil which was discovered in Montana, in the United States, in 2014.

== Gallery ==
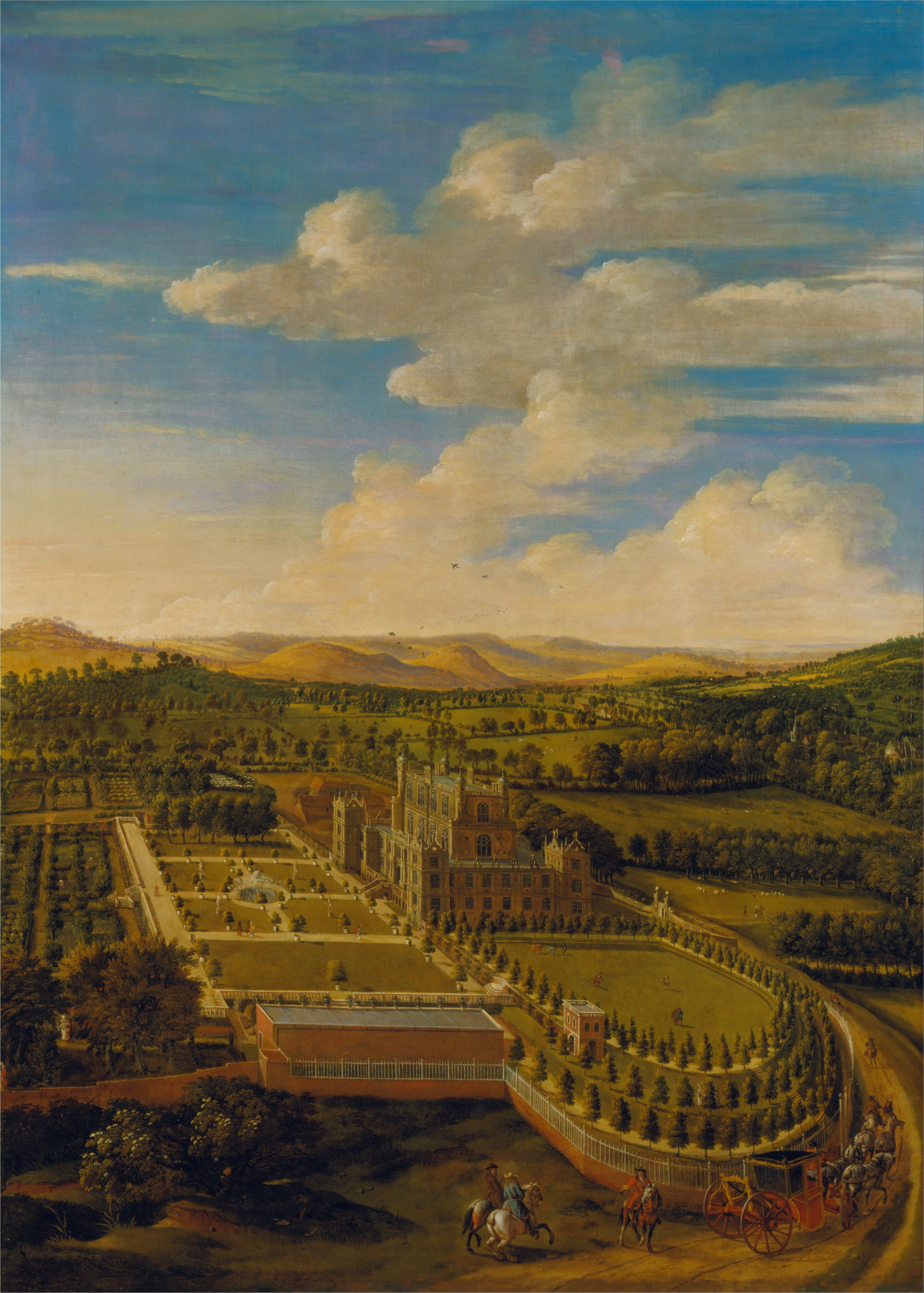
Wollaton Hall and grounds, painted c.1697 by Jan Siberechts

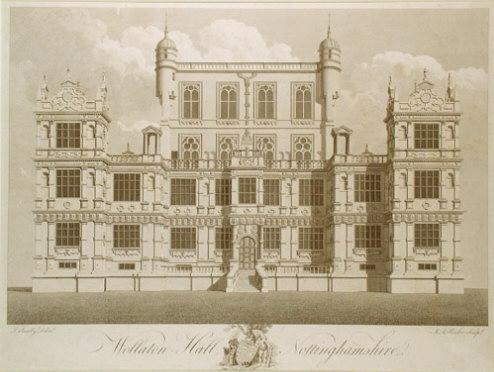
Wollaton Hall in the late 18th century, engraving by M. A. Rooker after a drawing by Thomas Sandby

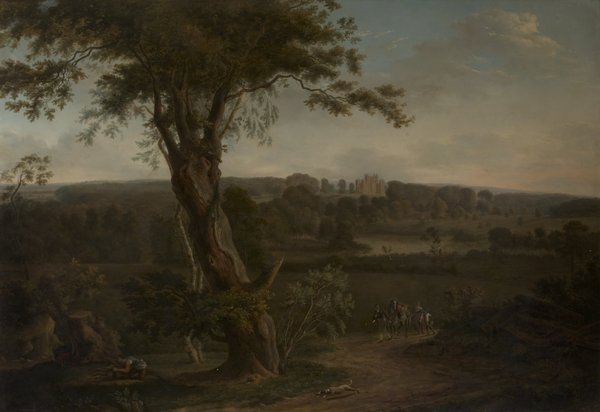
Wollaton Hall Park, painted c.1795 by Hendrik Frans de Cort

== See also ==
- Grade I listed buildings in Nottinghamshire
- Listed buildings in Nottingham (Wollaton West ward)
