= Robert Smythson =

English architect

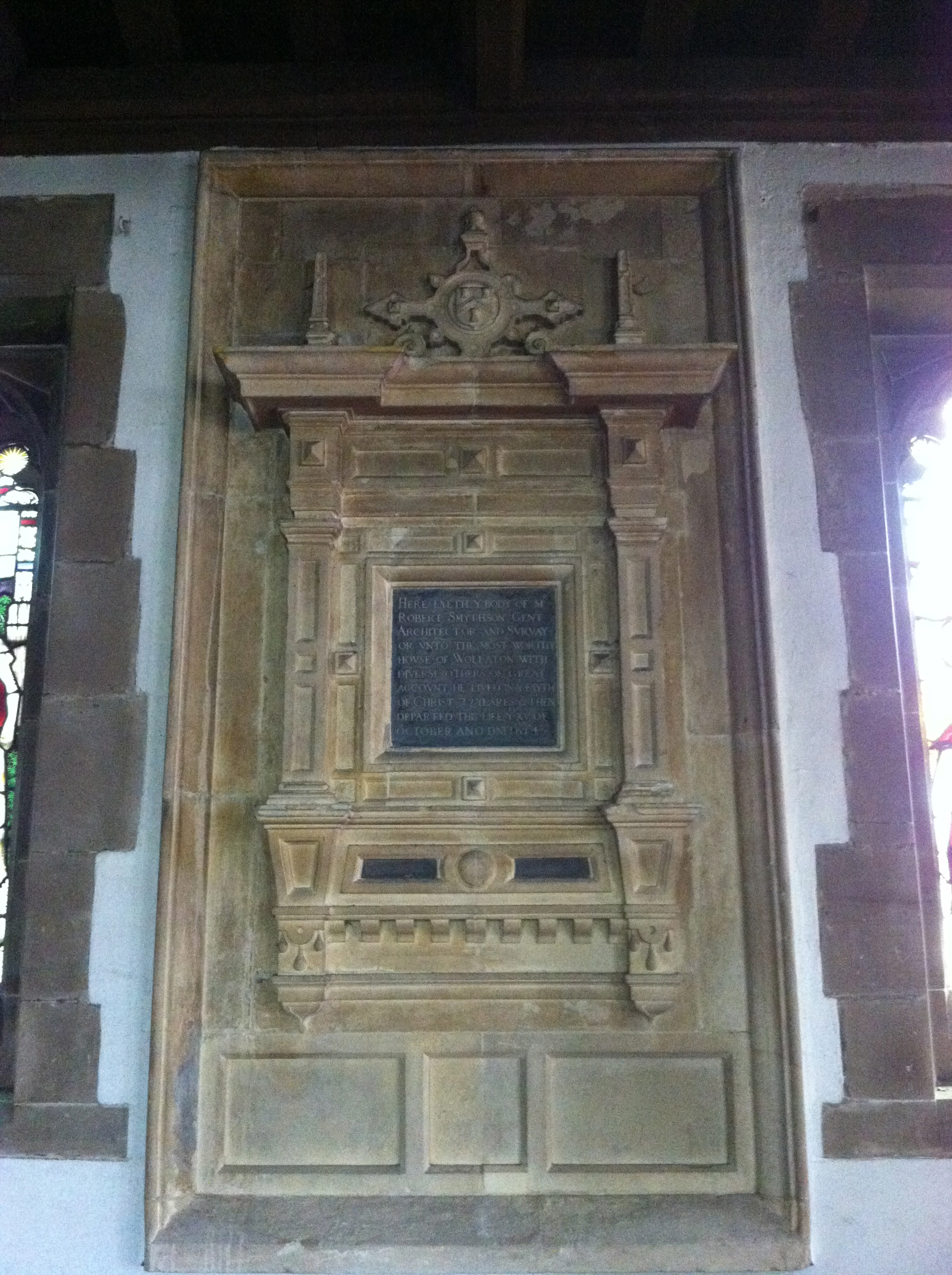
- Memorial to Smythson in St Leonard's Church, Wollaton
- Born: c. 1535 probably London, England
- Died: 15 October 1614 (aged 78–79); Wollaton, Nottinghamshire, England
- Occupation: Architect
- Buildings: Hardwick Hall; Wollaton Hall

Robert Smythson (c. 1535 – 15 October 1614) was an English architect. Smythson designed a number of notable houses during the Elizabethan era. Little is known about his birth and upbringing—his first mention in historical records comes in 1556, when he was stonemason for the house at Longleat, built by Sir John Thynne (ca. 1512–1580). He later designed Hardwick Hall, Wollaton Hall, Burton Agnes Hall, and other significant projects. Historically, a number of other Elizabethan houses, such as Gawthorpe Hall and Chastleton House, have been attributed to him on stylistic grounds.

In England at this time, the profession of architect was in its most embryonic stage of development. Smythson was trained as a stonemason, and by the 1560s was travelling England as a master mason leading his own team of masons. In 1568 he moved from London to Wiltshire to commence work on the new house at Longleat for Sir John Thynne; he worked there for almost eighteen years, carving personally much of the external detail, and he is believed to have had a strong influence on the overall design of the building. In 1580 he moved to his next project—Wollaton Hall. At Wollaton he was clearly more a "surveyor" (the term at that time for an architect) than a stonemason, and was in charge of overall construction.

Smythson's style was more than a fusion of influences; although Renaissance, especially Sebastiano Serlio, Flemish and English Gothic notes can be seen in his work, he produced some ingenious adaptations, resulting in classically detailed, innovative domestic buildings. Hardwick in particular is noted for its use of glass.

Smythson died at Wollaton in 1614 and is buried in the parish church there; his memorial includes these words "Architecter (sic) and Surveyor unto the most worthy house of Wollaton with divers others of great account." His son John Smythson (Bolsover Castle) and grandson Huntingdon Smithson (as he spelt the family name) were also architects.

== Gallery of architectural works ==
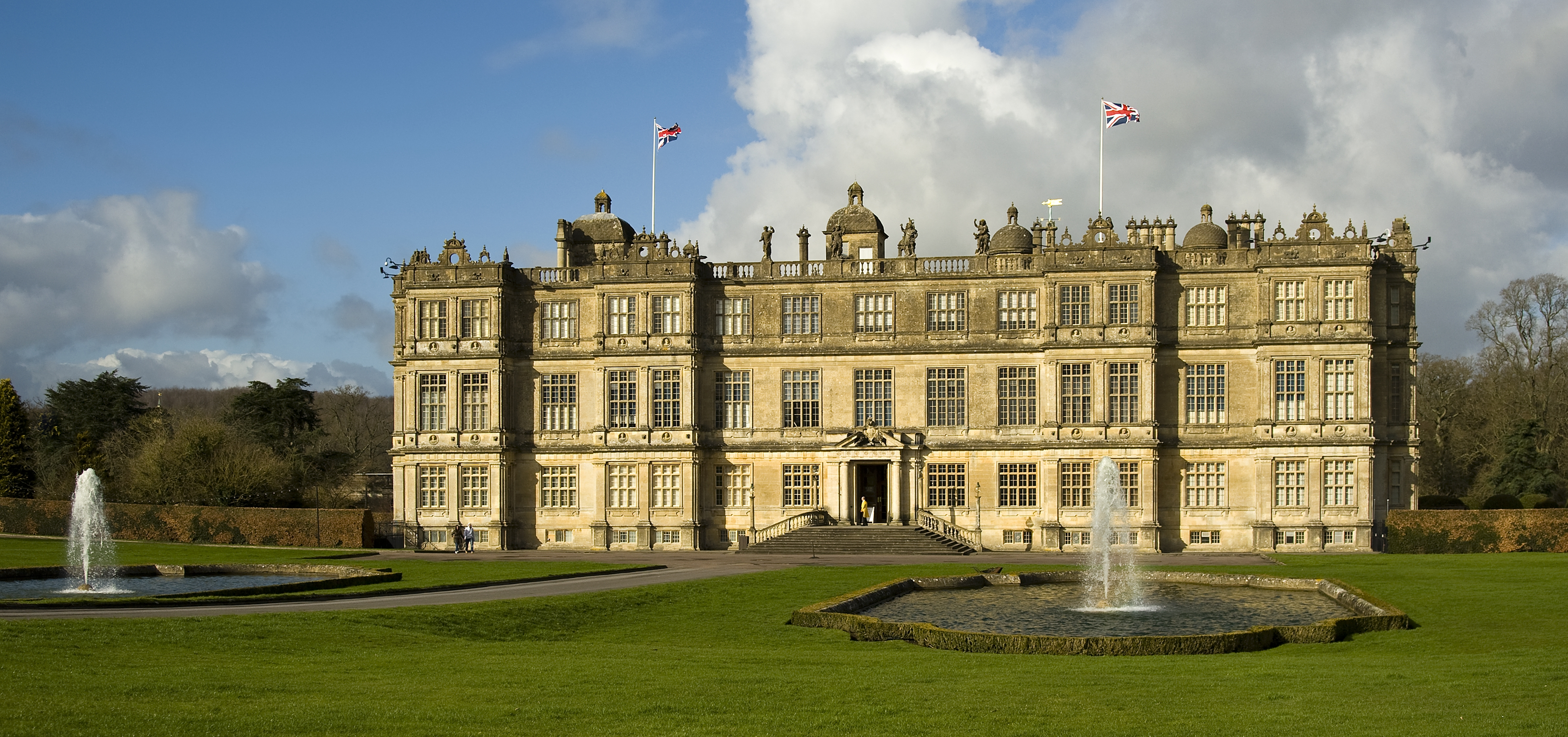
Longleat House

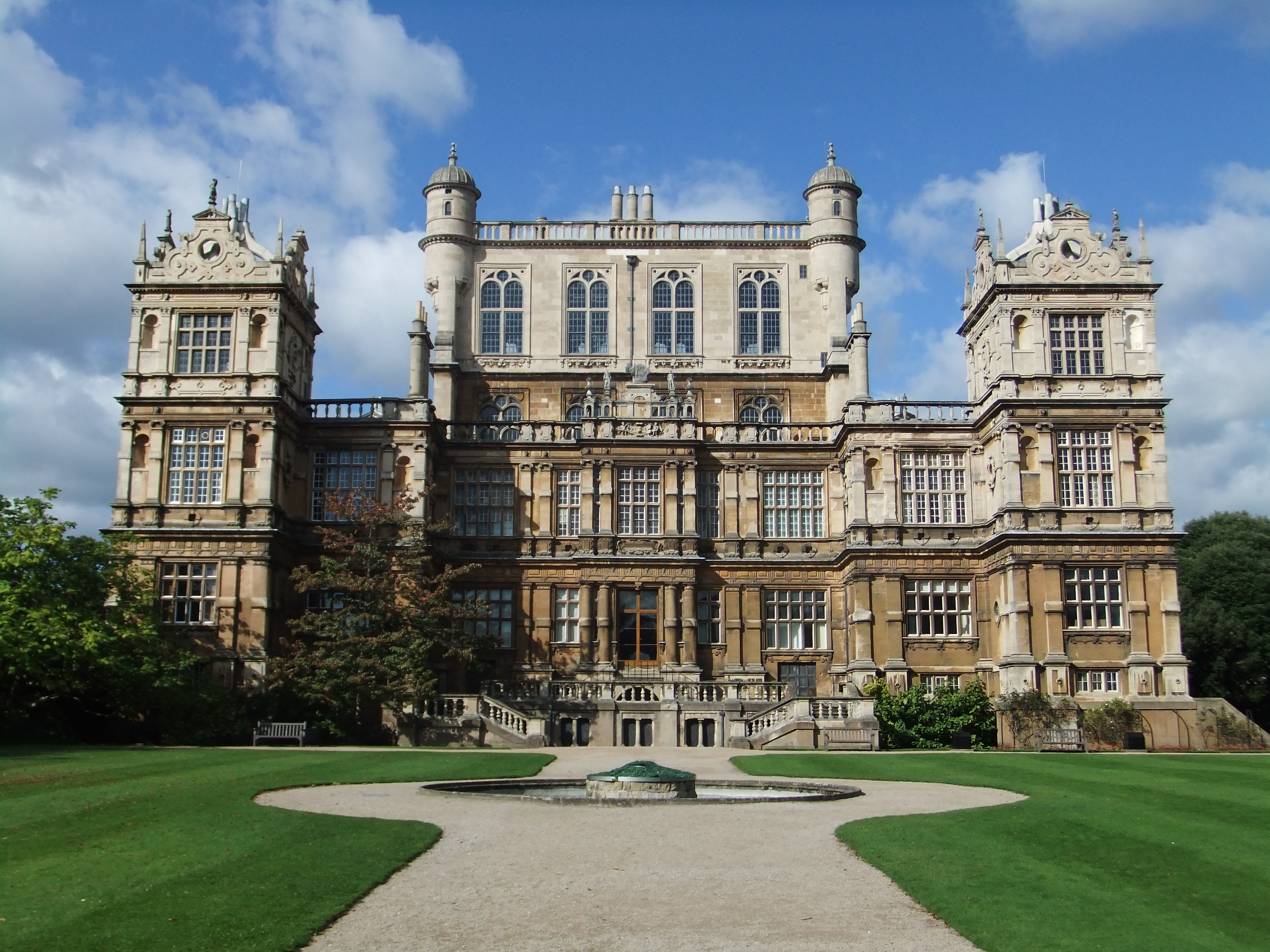
Wollaton Hall

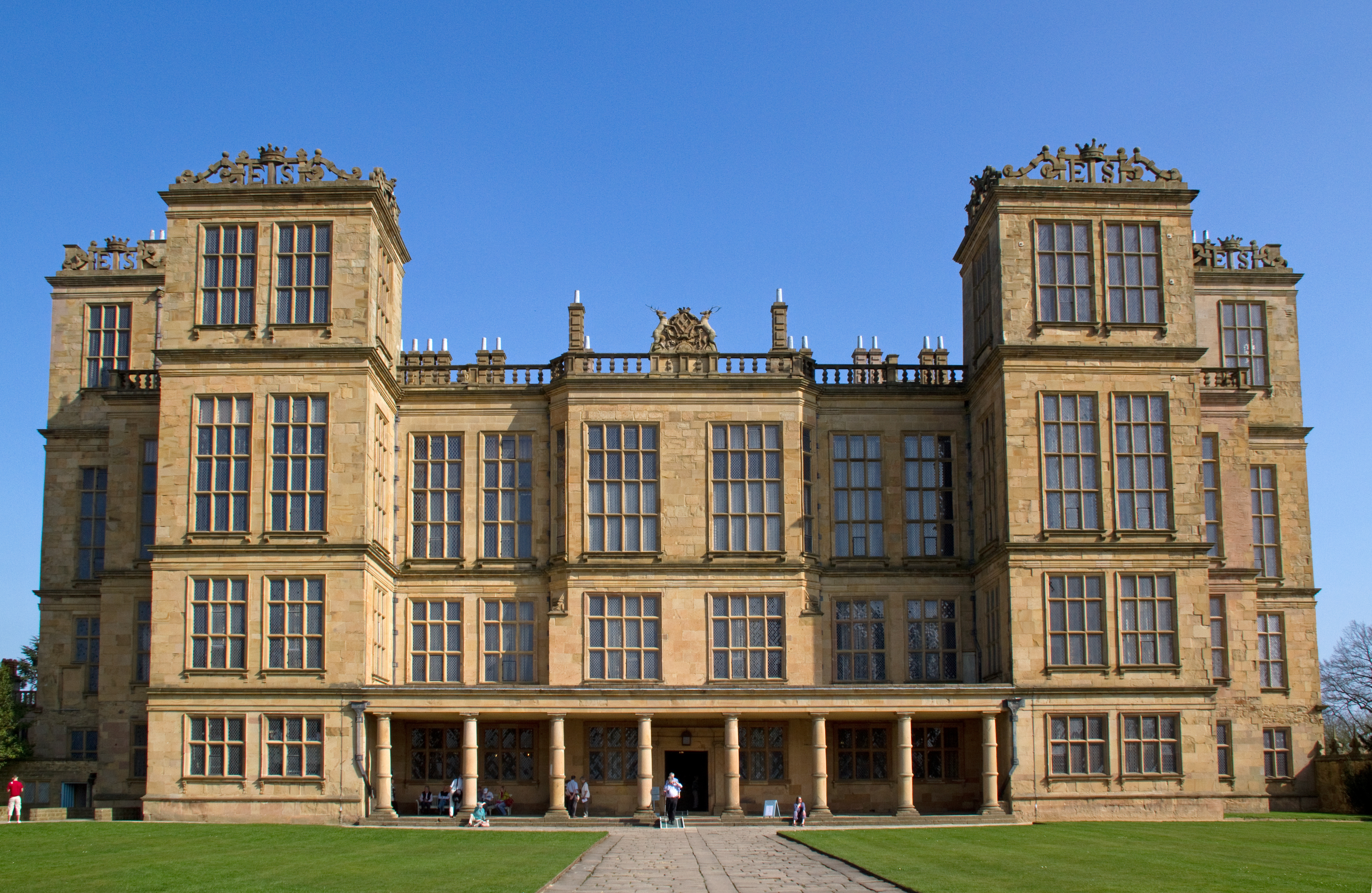
Hardwick Hall
