= Wollaton Antiphonal =

The Wollaton Antiphonal is an illuminated manuscript currently held in the collection of the University of Nottingham in England, UK.

== History ==
The antiphonal was commissioned by Sir Thomas Chaworth of Wiverton. It was completed in 1430 and was used in his private chapel at Wiverton Manor.

After Chaworth's death in 1459, the manuscript was in use at St. Leonard's Church, Wollaton, until Catholic Latin service books were banned in the Reformation in the 1540s.

The antiphonal was kept safe by the Willoughby family (later the Barons Middleton) in Wollaton Hall library until 1924, when it was returned to the church. In 1974 it was put in the care of the Middleton collection at the department of Manuscripts and Special Collections, The University of Nottingham, along with other papers belonging to the family.

== 21st century ==
The University of Nottingham has been examining and conserving the antiphonal for several years. Work has included removal of a 19th-century binding, rebinding into two volumes and consolidating pigments. In 2023, over 70 pages of the manuscript can be viewed online through their "Turning the Pages" project.

The manuscript is the only surviving source of the melodies which form the Office for St John of Bridlington. The antiphonal is still used to inspire new music.
