= Henry Willoughby, 5th Baron Middleton =

English nobleman

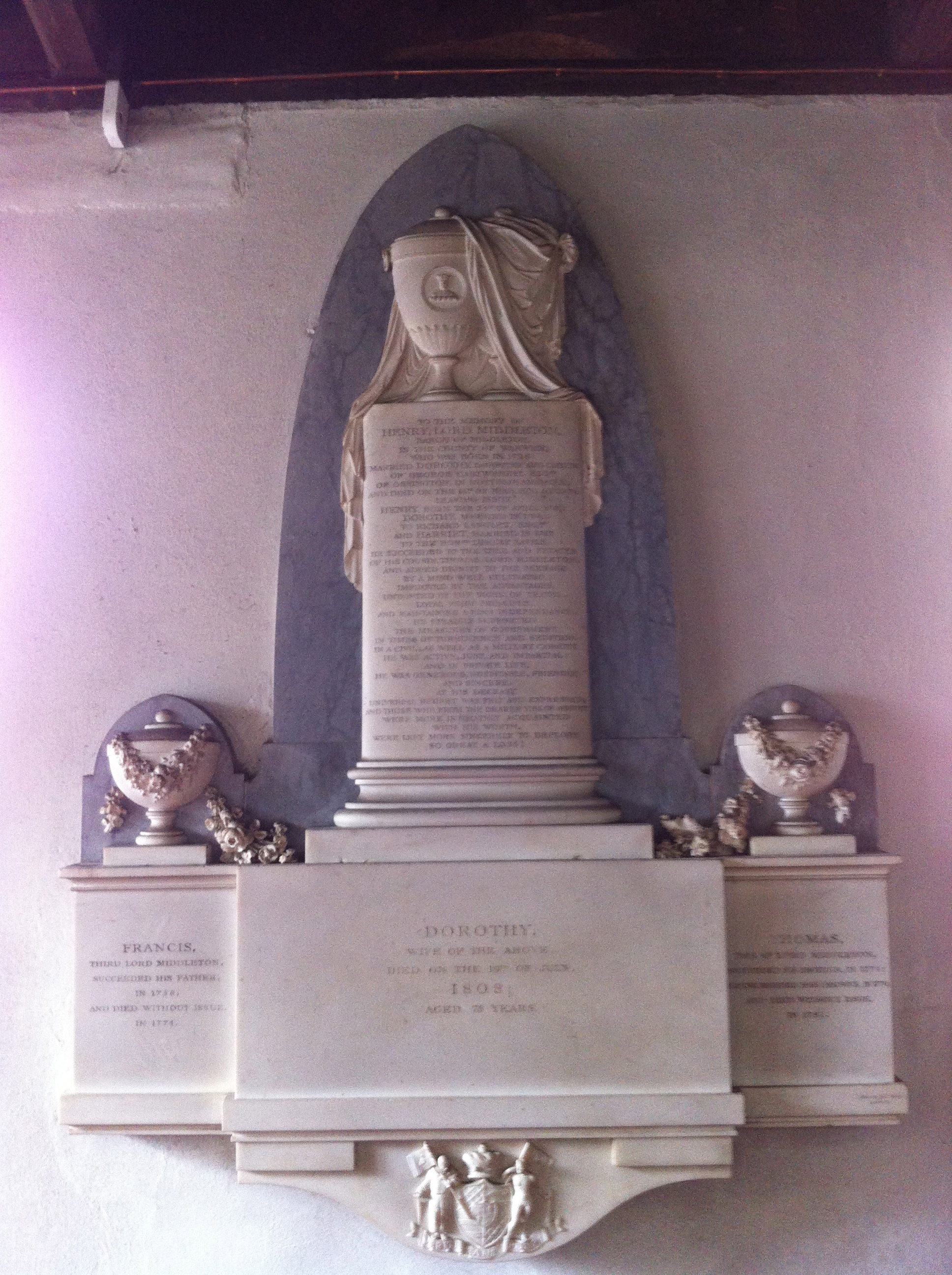
Memorial in St. Leonard's Church, Wollaton to Henry, 5th Baron Middleton

Henry Willoughby, 5th Baron Middleton (19 December 1726 – 14 June 1800), was an English nobleman, the son of Hon. Thomas Willoughby.

He was born at York in 1726 and entered Jesus College, Cambridge, in 1745. He succeeded his father in 1742, inheriting Birdsall House. In 1757, he served as High Sheriff of Yorkshire. He succeeded his cousin Thomas Willoughby to the Middleton barony and estates (Wollaton Park and Middleton Hall, Warwickshire) in 1781.

He married Dorothy Cartwright in 1756 and lived in the family seat at Wollaton Park, Nottinghamshire. They had three children:

- Henry Willoughby, 6th Baron Middleton (1761–1835)
- Hon. Dorothy Willoughby (d. 13 April 1824, married on 24 November 1784 Richard Langley of Wykeham Abbey
- Hon. Henrietta Willoughby (d. March 1846), married Richard Lumley-Saunderson, 6th Earl of Scarbrough

His memorial is in St. Leonard's Church, Wollaton.

Honorary titles
Preceded by Sir G. M. Metham	High Sheriff of Yorkshire; 1757–1758	Succeeded by Jeremiah Dixon
Peerage of Great Britain
Preceded by Thomas Willoughby	Baron Middleton; 1781–1800	Succeeded by Henry Willoughby
