= Splendour in Nottingham =

Annual music festival

Coordinates: 52°56′56″N 1°12′36″W

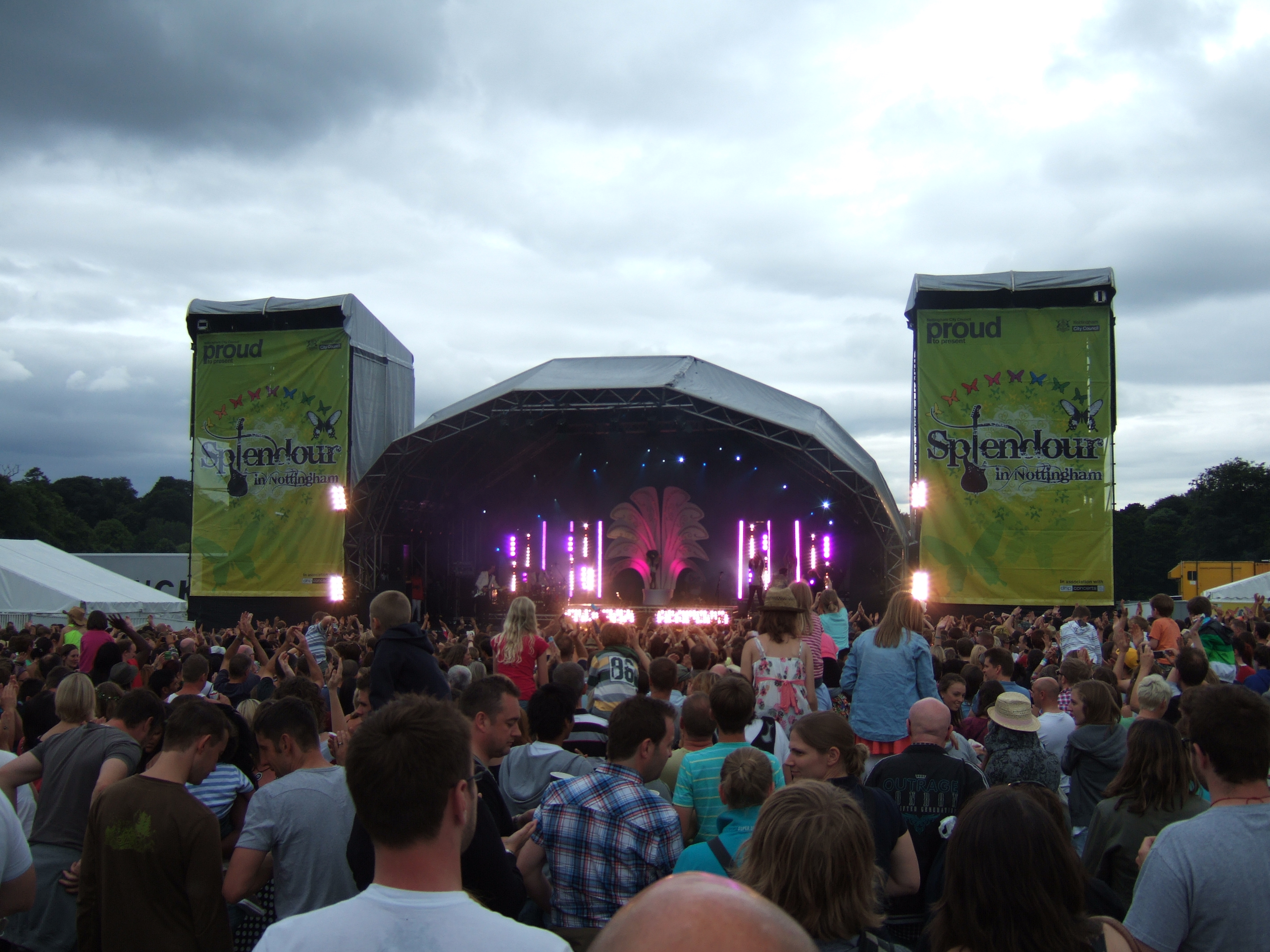
- Main stage, 2010
- Genre: Various
- Dates: July
- Locations: Wollaton Park, Nottingham, England, UK
- Years active: 2008 – 2019, 2022 – 2023, 2025 – 2026
- Founders: Nottingham City Council and DHP Family Ltd
- Capacity: 25,000
- Website: Splendour Festival

Splendour in Nottingham (more commonly known as Splendour or Splendour Festival) was an annual, mostly one-day music festival held in Nottingham, England from 2008 until 2026. Organised by Nottingham City Council and DHP Family Ltd, the event was held within Wollaton Park, to the west of Nottingham City Centre. The first event was held in 2008 as a two-day event featuring artists Kate Nash, Paolo Nutini, Ocean Colour Scene and Rufus Wainwright. In 2019 the capacity of the festival was 25,000.

No concerts were held during the COVID-19 years of 2020 and 2021; for 2022 and 2023, Splendour returned as two-day events. In January 2024, it was announced that the 2024 event was cancelled. A replacement event at Wollaton, entitled Live at the Hall and scheduled for 30 August 2024, was announced in February. The event then returned in 2025.

The organisers announced in June 2026 that the event scheduled for 18 and 19 July would be their last Splendour.

== History ==
=== 2026 ===
The final event of the series was headlined by The Wombats and Snow Patrol, with support acts including Primal Scream, Craig David Presents TS5, Editors, The K's, The Flaming Lips, Hard Life, The Lathums, Estelle, Cast, Neville Staple from The Specials, Kingfishr, The Futureheads, The Pigeon Detectives and The Sugarhill Gang.

=== 2025 ===
The event returned on the 19 and 20 of July, headlined by Bloc Party, Kaiser Chiefs, Travis and home-town favourite Jake Bugg.

=== 2024 ===
Event cancelled. Nottingham City Council had introduced a competitive tendering process during 2023, and the traditional organisers, the Akins family, felt there was insufiicent time, stating it needs over one year to plan the event.

=== 2023 ===
The festival was held as a two-day event, with headliners Madness (band) and Noel Gallagher's High Flying Birds.

=== 2022 ===
Artists include Vicky McClure with the Dementia Choir, Ann Marie, Happy Mondays, Richard Ashcroft, Supergrass, Craig David, The Human League, Razorlight, The Vamps, Ocean Colour Scene, Tom Grennan and local singer Beka. Two stages were used, with a smaller Confetti and Comedy stage sited in the courtyard area.

=== 2019 ===
2019's festival was held on Saturday, 20 July and headlined by indie band Manic Street Preachers and 2 Tone and ska revival band The Specials, the first time an act has headlined the festival twice (the first time was 2015).

- Main Stage: Manic Street Preachers, The Specials, Rag'n'Bone Man, Louisa, The Slow Readers Club, Barns Courtney, Rob Green and NUSIC's Future Sound of Nottingham Winner 2019 (announced soon).
- Confetti Stage: All Saints, Ash, Roland Gift (Fine Young Cannibals), The Rifles, The Coronas, Bria and AVA SAINT.
- Acoustic Rooms Stage: My Pet Fauxes, Mid November, Esther Van Leuven, Megatrain, Velvet Blush, 94 Gunships, Re Teu, Camille Christel and Laurie Illingworth
- Comedy Stage: Andy Robinson, Suzy Bennett, Roger Monkhouse, Vince Atta, Sean Heydon and Nathan Caton.
- Fringe Stage: Rhymes Against Humanity, Mrs Mabel Green and The Bar Steward Sons of Val Doonican.

=== 2018 ===
2018's festival was held on Saturday, 21 July, celebrating 10 years of the festival. The festival was headlined by pop star and BRIT Award winner, Paloma Faith.

- Main Stage: Paloma Faith, The Charlatans, Marc Almond, Bjorn Again, Sophie Ellis-Bextor, Ady Suleiman, Nina Smith and NUSIC's Future Sound of Nottingham Winner 2018, The Dandylions.
- Confetti Stage: The Stranglers, Embrace, Peace, Ferocious Dog, Toploader and Ashfields.
- Acoustic Rooms Stage: To Kill A King, George Gadd, Soham De, Joey Costello, Re Teu, Katie Cooper and Daisy Godfrey.
- Comedy Stage: Brian Krysstal, Dave Twentyman, Andrew Bird, Patrick Monaham, Alan Hudson and The Raymond and Mr Timpkins Revue.

=== 2017 ===
2017's festival was held on Saturday, 22 July. The festival was headlined by indie band and BRIT Award winners, Kaiser Chiefs.

- Main Stage: Kaiser Chiefs, Busted, Tony Hadley (ex Spandau Ballet), Gabrielle Aplin, Will Varley, Yola Carter, Georgie and NUSIC's Future Sound of Nottingham Winner 2017, Brotherhood
- Confetti Stage: Billy Ocean, Black Grape, British Sea Power, Buzzcocks, Bud, Josh Wheatley and Easy Life
- Acoustic Rooms Stage: Into The Ark, Young T & Bugsy, Unknown Era, Tom Lumley, Sunflower Thieves, Yazmin Lacey, Jimi Mack, Lisa Hendricks and Billie
- Comedy Stage: Barry Dodds, Scott Bennett, Steve Royle, Jollyboat, Wes Zaharuk and Jim Smallman

=== 2016 ===
2016's festival was held on Saturday, 23 July. The festival was headlined by pop star Jess Glynne, who cancelled her appearance in 2015 to receive vocal surgery.

- Main Stage: Jess Glynne, The Human League, UB40, Jamie Lawson, Turin Brakes, Jeremy Loops, Ady Suleiman and NUSIC's Future Sound of Nottingham Winner 2016, Super Furniture
- Confetti Stage: The Darkness, The Fratellis, The Rifles, Stiff Little Fingers, Louis Berry, These Your Children and Eyre Llew
- Acoustic Rooms Stage: Will Varley, Brad Dear, Tom McCartney, Bru-C, Ellie Keegan, Josh Wheatley, Raphael Blake and Lowrie
- Comedy Stage: John Ryan, Patrick Monahan, Ivan Brackenbury, El Baldiniho, Tom Binns and Vince Atta

=== 2015 ===
2015's festival was held on Saturday, 18 July. The festival was headlined by 2 Tone and ska revival band, The Specials, with a special guest appearance from rock band, James.

- Main Stage: The Specials, James, Lawson, Indiana^{NB}, Roots Manuva, Amber Run, To Kill a King and NUSIC's Future Sound of Nottingham Winner 2015, Suspect Alibi (with special guest Josh Wheatley)
- Confetti Stage: Bananarama, The Twang, Ferocious Dog, Iris Gold, Keto, The Swiines and Georgie
- Acoustic Rooms Stage: Hhymm, Joy Mumford, Eyre Llew, Pierce Brothers, Jamie Lawson, Martin Luke Brown, Daudi Matsiko, Molly and Jack, RJMarks and Cedric Peters
- Comedy Stage: Andy Robinson (Compère), Jollyboat, Ian D Montford, Ellie Taylor, Christian Reilly and John Robertson

Jess Glynne was set to play the Main Stage. However, due to her vocal cord surgery in 2015, she was forced to pull out just weeks before the festival and was replaced by Indiana.

=== 2014 ===
2014's festival was held on Saturday, 19 July. It was from 2014 that the festival became sponsored by Nottingham's very own Confetti instead of Jägermeister. The festival was headlined by singer-songwriter and BRIT Award winner, Tom Odell and rock band, Happy Mondays.

- Main Stage: Tom Odell, Happy Mondays, Scouting For Girls, Foxes, Saint Raymond, The Beat (British band), Ron Pope and NUSIC's Future Sound of Nottingham Winner 2014, Joy Mumford
- Confetti Stage: The Boomtown Rats, Reverend & The Makers, The Rifles (band), A Plastic Rose, Amber Run, Uncle Frank and Keto
- Acoustic Rooms Stage: Noah, Billy Lockett, Bud, Bitter Stings, Gallery 47, Fields, Ryan Thomas, Frankie Rudolf and George Holroyd
- Comedy Stage: Brendan Riley (Compère), Nick Page, Gerry K, Steve Royle, Patrick Monahan and The Raymond and Mr Timpkins Revue

=== 2013 ===
2013's festival was held on Saturday, 20 July. The festival was headlined by Nottingham's own, Jake Bugg.

- Main Stage: Jake Bugg, Squeeze, KT Tunstall, Dog Is Dead, Nina Nesbitt, Jack Savoretti, Indiana and NUSIC's Future Sound of Nottingham Winner 2013, The Gorgeous Chans
- Jägermeister Stage: Maxïmo Park, Peter Hook & The Light, Kagoule, Park Bench Society, Rob Green, Saint Raymond and Ferocious Dog
- NCN Courtyard Stage: Ryan Keen, Harleighblu, Joel Baker, Gavin James, Injured Birds, Georgie Rose, Ryan Thomas and OneGirlOneBoy
- Comedy Stage: Craig Murray, Andrew Bird, Raymond and Mr Timpkins Revue, Martin Mor, Andy Robinson and Mickey D

=== 2012 ===
2012s festival was held on Saturday, 21 July. The festival was headlined by MC and rapper, Dizzee Rascal.

- Main Stage: Dizzee Rascal, Razorlight, Katy B, Hard-Fi, Bjorn Again, Jake Bugg, NUSIC's Future Sound of Nottingham Winner 2012, The Afterdark Movement
- Jägermeister Stage: Levellers, Ronika, The Lightning Seeds, To Kill a King, Vadoinmessico, Kappa Gamma, The Barnum Meserve, Sinners Highway
- Leftlion Courtyard Stage: Josh Keogh, Opie Dieno, Indiana, Saint Raymond, Rob Green, Nina Smith, Ryan Keen, Miss 600, Natalie Duncan
- Comedy Stage: Vince Atta, The Raymond & Mr Timkins Revue, Anil Desai, Nick Beaton, Scottish Falsetto Sock Puppet Theatre, Dave Twentyman (compère)

=== 2011 ===
2011s festival was held on Sunday, 24 July. The festival was headlined by pop/rock band Scissor Sisters and rock band Blondie.

- Main Stage: Scissor Sisters, Blondie, Eliza Doolittle, Cast, Justin Currie, Sam Duckworth
- Secondary Stage: Feeder, The Bluetones, Dog Is Dead, The Virginmarys, Romance, Swimming, Royal Gala, Harleighblu
- LeftLion Courtyard Stage: Scott Matthews, The Petebox, Cecille Grey, Luke Bingham, Allie Moss, Gallery 47, Jake Bugg
- Comedy Stage: Nick Page (compère), Andy White, Wes Zaharuk, Roger Monkhouse, Patrick Monahan, Dan Evens

=== 2010 ===
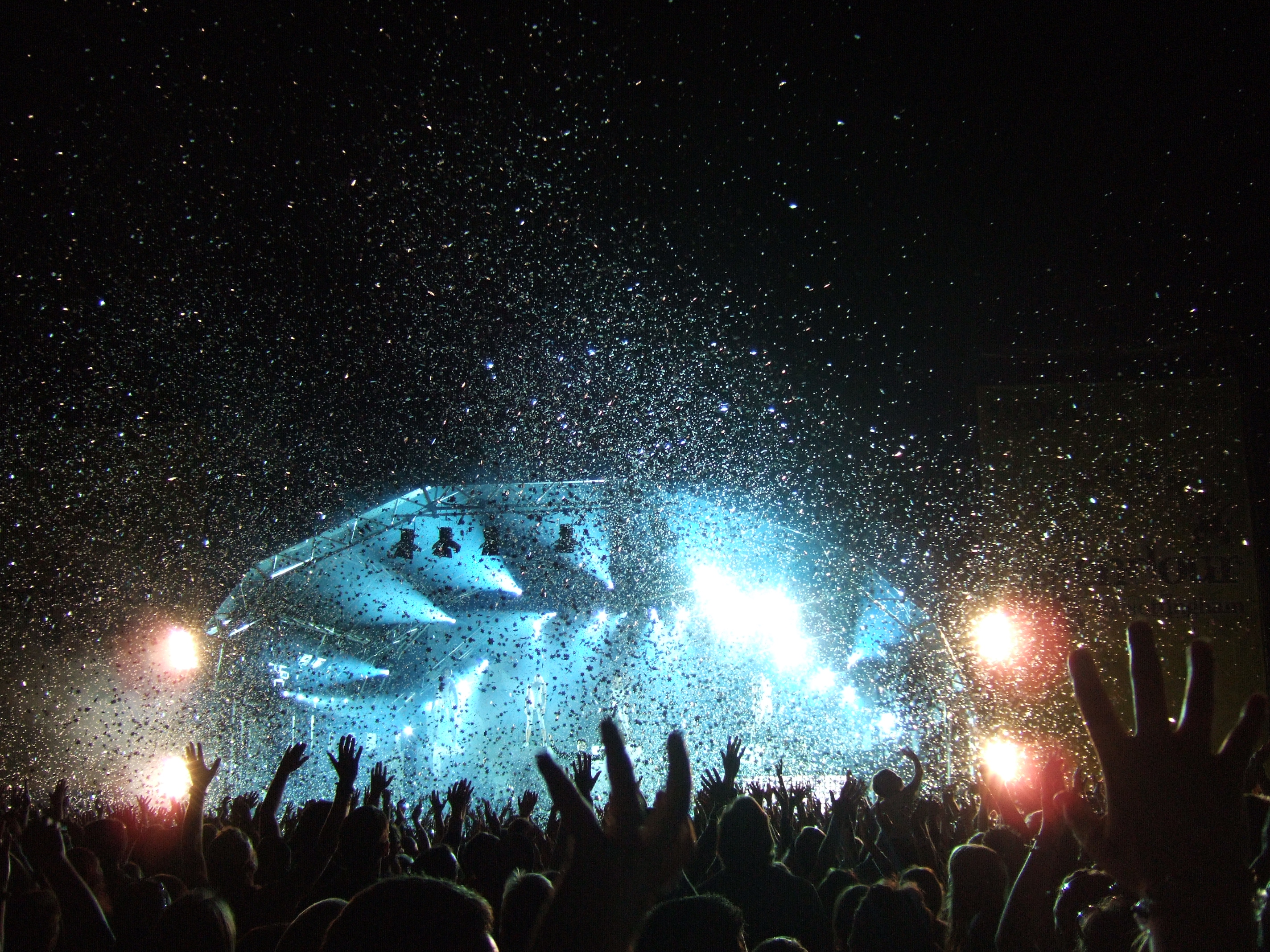
Main stage, 2010

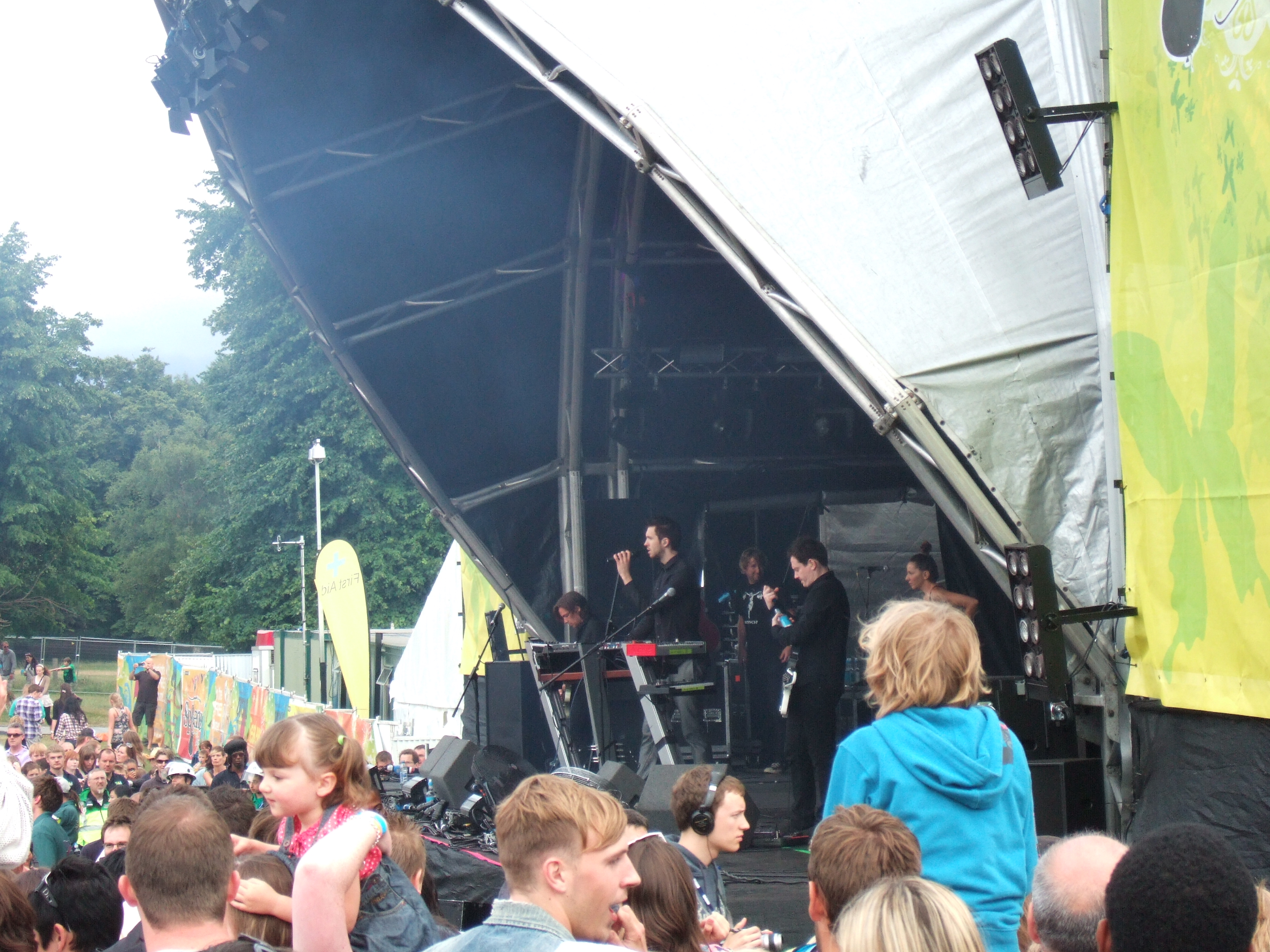
Calvin Harris at the festival

2010s festival was held on Saturday, 24 July. The festival was headline by synth-pop duo, Pet Shop Boys. Music producer, Calvin Harris also appeared at the festival.

- Main Stage: Pet Shop Boys, Calvin Harris, Noisettes, Athlete, OK Go, The Leisure Society, Ronika
- Right field Stage: Shed Seven, Terrorvision, Fyfe Dangerfield, Celine and Nite Wreckage, Dog is Dead, Frontiers, Fists, The Wax Dramatic.
- Small World Stage: Talvin Singh, Rango, Jaipur Kawa Brass Band, T and Latouche, Asere, Bayou Seco, Hhymn, I Only Date Models.
- LeftLion Courtyard Stage: James Walsh, Marcus Foster, Pete Lawrie, Nadine Shah, Nina Smith, Liam Bailey, Jay Thomas

=== 2009 ===
2009s festival was held on Saturday, 18 July. The festival was headlined by ska band Madness.

- Artists performing: Madness, The Pogues, Fun Lovin' Criminals, Imelda May, The Rifles, Kid British, Dog Is Dead

=== 2008 ===
The first Splendour festival was held on 19 and 20 July. The festival was headlined by singer-songwriters Kate Nash and Paolo Nutini.

- Artists performing on Saturday, the 19th: Kate Nash, The Charlatans, Ocean Colour Scene, Tom Baxter, Lightspeed Champion, The Recovery
- Artists performing on Sunday, the 20th: Paolo Nutini, Rufus Wainwright, The Lemonheads, Duke Special, Sam Beeton, Liam Gerner, House of Brothers
