= Miss 600 =

English music duo

Miss 600 are an English musical duo from Derby composed of Hannah Garner (vocals) and David Amar (drums, lead guitar, bass guitar). Their songs are influenced by genres such as jazz, blues and R&B.

== Background ==
Initially Hannah and David spent time gigging around the local Derby area, while at the same time Hannah had also started her own YouTube channel onto which she loaded tracks of herself singing a capella renditions of various covers into a web cam. So well received were these little amateur videos that not only had hundreds of thousands of fans viewed them, but four thousand actually subscribed to the channel. And Hannah was only 17 years old at the time. David comes from a musical family and had been playing drums in his father's Latin/Jazz band Solar Latino since aged 13, as well as going to weekly regular jams since the age of 10, where he diversified into playing bass and guitar too. Within a few months the pair had been spotted playing at an open mic night at Ryans Bar in Derby by local Nottingham producers Christopher Bucknall and Robert de Fresnes. Chris and Robert were impressed enough to sign the duo to their Cubit Recordings label during the Autumn of 2010 and began working with them to help develop their sound and image and so Miss 600 was born.

== Exposure ==
By early 2011, Miss 600's debut album entitled Buying Time had been recorded and featured classy, but simple pop songs with more than a jazz twist. The album included several interesting collaborations including the title track "Buying Time" which had been written by the Nottingham-based singer-songwriter Sam Beeton. Duets with Maxi Priest and former RCA Records artist Sonna Rele worked well, as did a track called "Is This Love" which featured a sample from the soundtrack to the 1977 film Il Gatto by film composer Ennio Morricone. The sample had also been cleared and approved by the composer with kind permission of his publishers Kassner Music. In May 2011, promotional work had begun on Miss 600's debut single entitled "Twist". The single quickly found support from many regional radio stations and newspapers including the Derby Telegraph, Nottingham Post, and Bliss magazine. They also received support from a growing number of producers at BBC Radio 2. That support culminated in "Twist" being placed on the BBC Radio 2 B playlist on 15 June. They then went on to Radio 2 A playlist where it remained for seven weeks.

The album Buying Time has also been released in other territories, and immediately charted in Poland at 55. They subsequently appeared on several Polish TV and radio shows, performing on Dzien Dobry TVN morning TV show, Pytanie na Sniadanie TV show and Radio Chili Zet. Additionally, Miss600 played on Poland's most watched show, Taniec Z Gwiazdami (Dancing With the Stars) in front of several million viewers. Following appearances on several high-profile UK radio stations, including the Sir Terry Wogan Show on BBC Radio 2 and as the mystery guest on the Chris Evans Radio show, Miss 600 again made the BBC Radio 2 playlist with the single, "Typically Me" in December 2011.

Success continued into 2012 and Miss600 performed at several high-profile events including Cheltenham Jazz Festival and Splendour Festival, Nottingham. Their next single, "Hello", again made the BBC Radio 2 playlist for a number of weeks and was featured on the trailer for the BBC sitcom, Not Going Out. Miss 600's music has also been played on several high-profile television programmes in the UK including Coronation Street, Britain's Got Talent, Emmerdale and Crufts.

In early 2013, Miss600 signed a licensing deal with German label, Membran and released in Germany in spring of that year, making their debut German performance at the Elb Jazz Festival.

In May 2013, Miss 600 did their most prestigious show to date, supporting Mario Biondi and Incognito at the Royal Albert Hall adding to the list of headline acts they have supported including Imelda May, M People, Jake Bugg and 10cc.

In August 2013, Miss 600's fourth single "Hello" was playlisted by Polish Radio 1 and was immediately made single of the week.

In July 2014, Miss600 represented the United Kingdom at the Baltic Song Contest in Karlshamn, Sweden.

== Discography ==
- "Twist" (2011) Debut single
- "Missing You" (2011) single
- "Typically Me" (2012) single
- "Hello" (2013) single
- Buying Time (2011) debut album
- Swing Ting (2014) second album
