= Wollaton Park =

Park in Nottingham, England

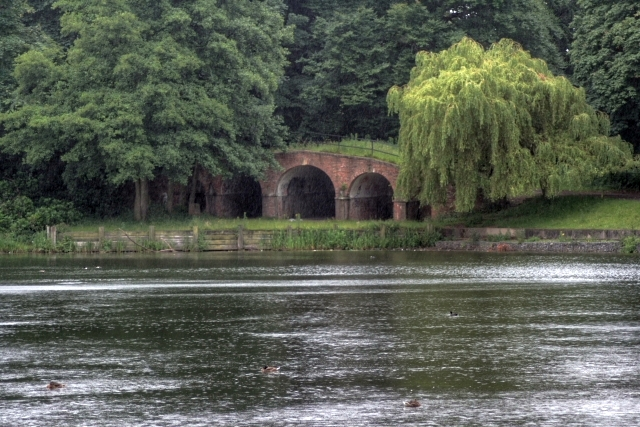
- False Bridge, Wollaton Park, seen from across the southern tip of the lake. This was probably a boathouse designed to "enhance the landscape".

- Location within Nottinghamshire
- Location: Wollaton, Nottinghamshire, England
- Nearest city: Nottingham
- Coordinates: 52°56′57″N 1°12′40″W
- Area: 202 hectares (500 acres)
- Operator: Nottingham City Council
- Other information: Postcode: NG8 2AE
- Website: https://wollatonhall.org.uk/

Wollaton Park is a Grade II listed 500-acre park in Nottingham, England, which includes a deer park. It is centred on Wollaton Hall, a classic Elizabethan prodigy house which contains the Nottingham Natural History Museum, with the Nottingham Industrial Museum in the stable block.

Various events including concerts are held in the park. The park has an active volunteering programme to support the upkeep of the park, run by the Friends of Wollaton Park.

== History ==
In 1492, an area of common grazing land was formally enclosed by Sir Henry Willoughby. In 1510, the park was expanded with the addition of a further 100 acres. When Wollaton Hall was built in 1588 by Sir Francis Willoughby, the park was further extended incorporating the village of Sutton Passeys. Around 1710, Thomas Willoughby replaced previous fencing with a red brick wall enclosing approximately 790 acres (3.2 km^{2}). In 1925 the site was acquired by Nottingham City Council and land sales have reduced the park to 500 acres (2.0 km^{2}). The park was opened to the public in 1926.

During World War II, American troops of the 508th Parachute Infantry Regiment, part of the US 82nd Airborne Division, were billeted in Wollaton Park, waiting to be parachuted into Europe, which happened in June 1944. A small plaque commemorates the event. Italian prisoners of war were later billeted here for employment in the locality between 1945 and 1947.

== Landscape ==
The park is a Georgian Landscape, with Parkland, Acid grassland, Formal Gardens, a Lake and a Walled Garden.

=== Formal Garden ===
One of the Cedrus libani planted in 1785

The Formal Garden behind the Hall dates back to 1588, originally a Baroque Garden as seen in Siberechts' Painting. After the creation of the Walled Garden, the garden was reconstructed in a Georgian Style, with a Cedar Lawn, Doric Temple, Formal Lawn and Camellia House.

The garden contains a Grade II Listed Fountain and Pond, dating back to the 17th century.

=== Lake ===
The 25-acre lake was created in the late 18th century as part of the landscaping of the Wollaton Park estate. The lake was formed by damming a small stream that ran through the park, creating a picturesque body of water that became a focal point of the park’s landscape.

=== Walled Garden ===
The Wollaton Walled Garden was built between 1783 and 1788. By 1990, it had become disused and left to nature, and by 2018, a group of volunteers, coordinated by Friends of Wollaton Park and Wollaton Historical & Conservation Society, started helping to restore, renovate the garden, as the Wollaton Walled Garden Project.

== Buildings ==
In addition to Wollaton Hall the park hosts 27 other listed structures.

=== Camellia House ===
The Camelia House of 1823 by Sir Jeffry Wyatville

Built in 1823, the Camellia House was designed by Sir Jeffry Wyatville, is a Grade II-listed building about 100 metres from the hall and one of the earliest cast iron glasshouses in the country. The heating equipment and possibly the cast-ironwork was constructed by Harrison of Derby.

=== Doric Temple ===
The Doric Temple is a late 18th-century Grade II listed structure with reused Roman columns and unique 16th-century plaster reliefs.

=== Lenton Lodge ===
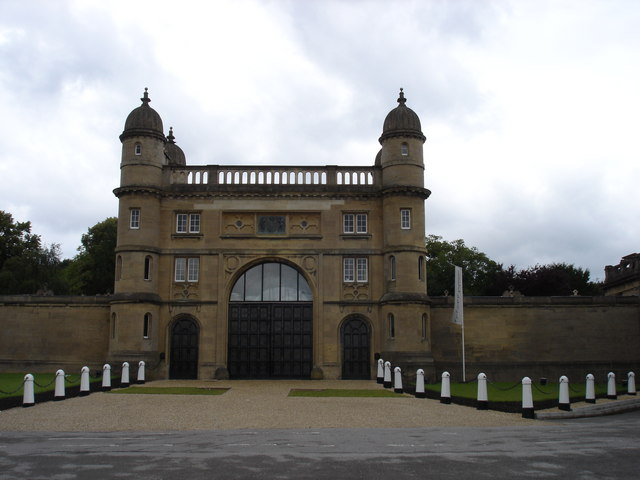
Lenton Lodge on Derby Road

Lenton Lodge is one of the gatehouses built around the boundary of Wollaton Park. Commissioned by Henry Willoughby, 6th Baron Middleton, it was designed by the architect Jeffry Wyatville and completed in 1825. It is built in the Elizabethan Revival style.

With the sale of part of the park for residential building, Lenton Lodge was separated from the rest of the park and now stands isolated but prominent on Derby Road in Lenton. It was sold by Nottingham City Council in the early 1980s .

A 99-year revolving lease was acquired in 1996 by Moiz Saigara, who obtained planning permission to convert the lodge to a single dwelling and undertook major restoration work using Julian Owen Associates as the architect. The main part of this work – apart from restoration and installation of services – was filling in the middle archway in order to connect the two wings without detracting from the appearance which identifies the building as a gatehouse. Lenton Lodge was used by Moiz Saigara as his residence from 1996 to 2006, when the lease was sold to Chek Whyte.

In 2006–2008, Lenton Lodge was restored by Chek Whyte Industries and sold as a 3,324 sq ft (308.8 m^{2}) office in 2009. It was occupied by Global Fire and Security for six years, before being sold to the University of Nottingham in 2016.

=== Beeston Lodge ===
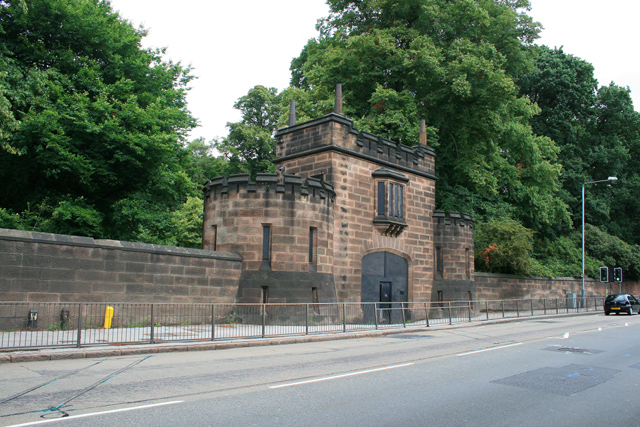
Beeston Lodge on Derby Road

Designed by the architect Jeffry Wyatville around 1832, Beeston Lodge is built of coursed Gritstone ashlar in a heavy Gothic style with "martello-type" round outer towers with battlements. The square central gatehouse is connected to the towers at the second floor level. It has an arched carriage entrance with an oriel window above. It was built following the Nottingham Reform riots of October 1831 and is now a Grade II listed building.

== Nature ==
Wollaton Park is a designated Local Nature Reserve, reflecting the wide biodiversity, including 150+ species of beetle; 9 species of bat; 70+ species of bird, with different nesting and feeding habits; 100+ species of wildflower, some of which are rare; bees; butterflies; moths; amphibians and fish in the lake; a diverse group of mammals and 120+ species of tree, among the estimated 6,000 trees.

The park is home to herds of red deer and fallow deer. There is a large corvid roost at the park, made up of rook, jackdaw, and carrion crow. Other bird species present at the site include jay, nuthatch and sparrowhawk. Migrating wildfowl grace the lake in the winter and species of note include gadwall, shoveler, wigeon and tufted duck. There is a good diversity of fungi present, especially in the winter months, mainly found near the wooded areas and the lake. Northern pike have been spotted swimming in the lake. There are 9 species of Bat in the park.

In 2017 local news reported that a pair of ring-necked parakeets had been seen in the park. These exotic birds have been breeding in London for several decades and spreading across the country, with sightings in Peterborough, Manchester, Liverpool, and even as far north as Edinburgh. In 2025 there are at least fifty parakeets living wild in Wollaton Park.

== Events ==
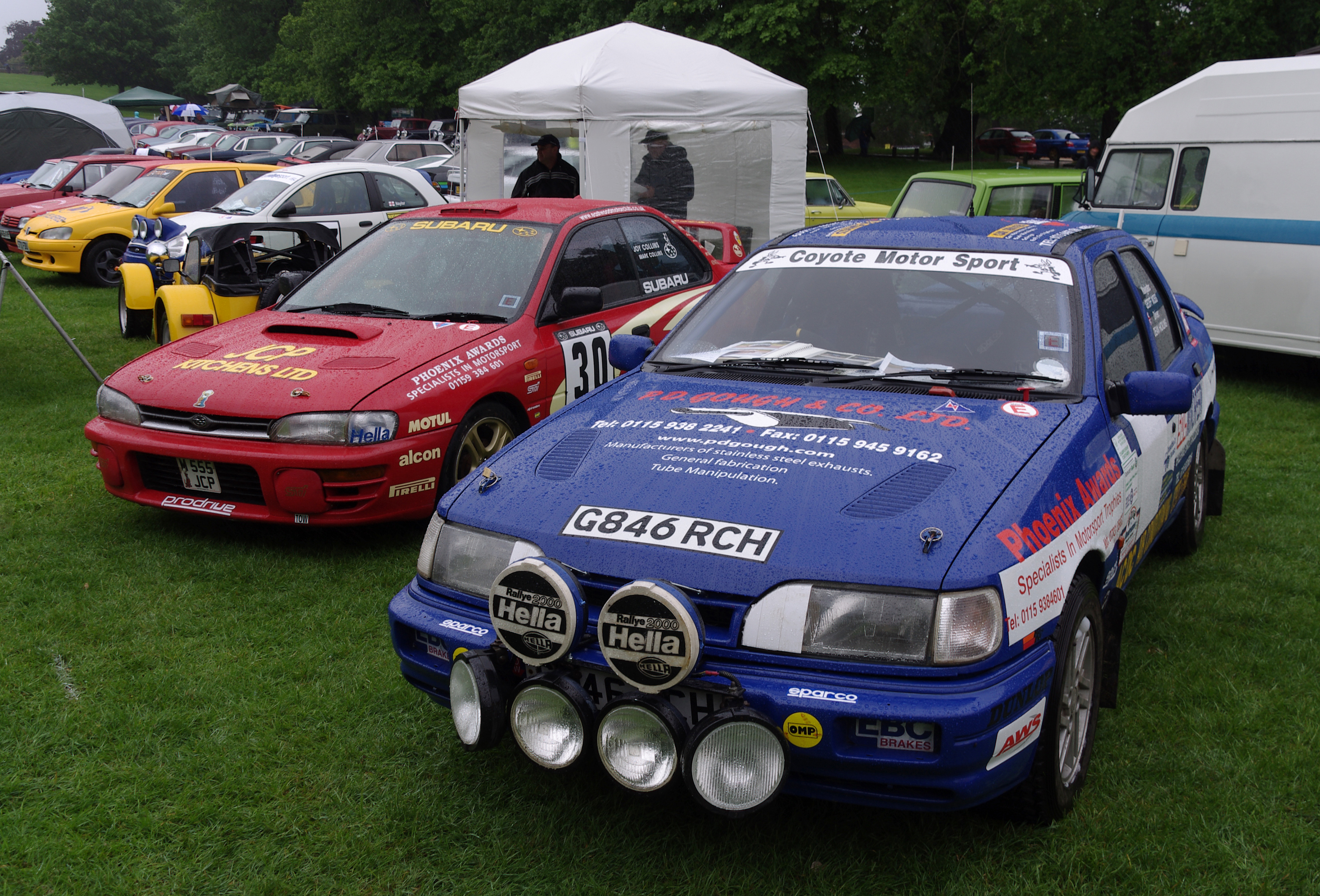
Rally cars at Nottingham Autokarna 2012

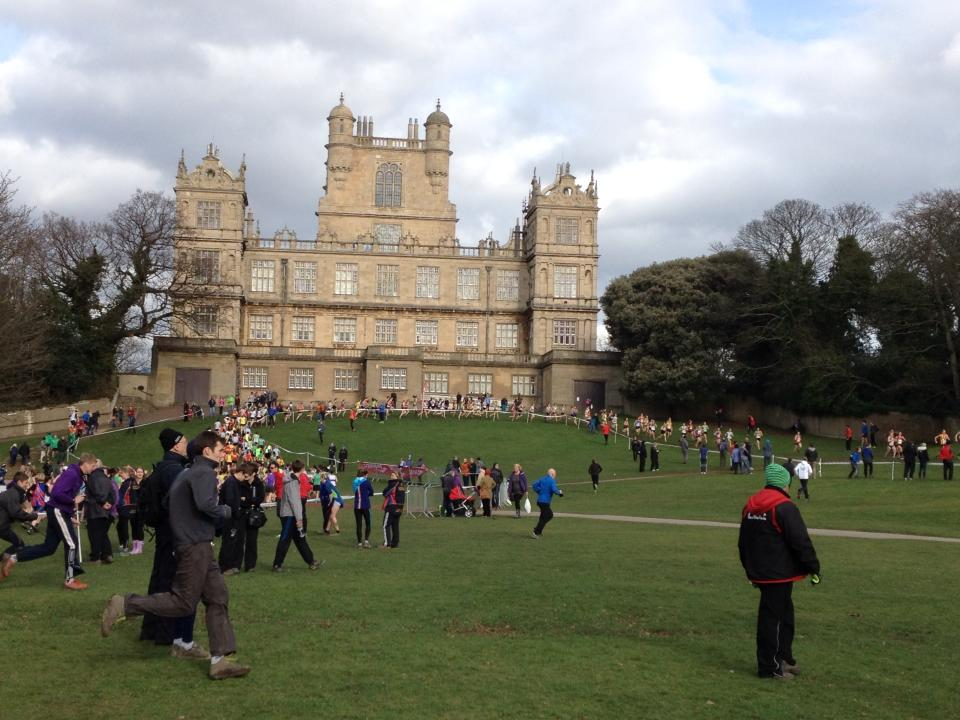
National Cross Country 2014, Wollaton Park

Wollaton Park is often used for major events, including:

- Splendour music festival held annually in July.
- Nottingham Autokarna, typically in June.
- Intercounties Cross Country trials in March of each year, and has hosted the English Schools Cross Country. February 2014, 2017 and 2020 saw the English National Cross Country Championships.
- Nottingham Steam and Country Show, typically in May.
- In 2011, key scenes from the Batman movie The Dark Knight Rises were filmed in Wollaton Park. Wollaton Hall was featured as the latest Wayne Manor.
- In 1985, 1987, 1989 and 1990, it hosted the RAC Rally for WRC.

== See also ==
- Listed buildings in Nottingham (Dunkirk and Lenton ward)
- Listed buildings in Nottingham (Wollaton West ward)
