= Frederick Slare =

English physician and chemist

Frederick Slare or Slear (1647?–1727) was an English physician and chemist, a follower of Robert Boyle and Thomas Sydenham.

== Early life ==
Born in Old, Northamptonshire, Slare was the son of Frederick Schloer, the German rector there, and Anna, daughter of Ralph Malory of Shelton; Theodore Haak was a cousin of his father. After studying at the University of Heidelberg from 1666, he lodged with Haak for a time, and began work as a laboratory assistant to Robert Boyle. He was corresponding with Gottfried Leibniz, by 1673.

== FRS and physician ==
Introduced by Robert Hooke to the Royal Society on 3 July 1679 to show experiments on spermatozoa, then recently discovered by Leeuwenhoek, Slare was recommended for election by Haak. He was admitted Fellow on 16 December 1680, and became a member of the council on 30 November 1682. From early 1683 he and Edward Tyson acted as Curators of Experiments for the society, and Slare was very active in this role for about 18 months.

Slare graduated M.D. at the University of Utrecht in 1679; and was admitted M.D. at Oxford on 9 September 1680. He was a candidate of the Royal College of Physicians on 25 June 1681, and Fellow on 25 June 1685. He acted as censor in 1692, 1693, and 1708; elector on 21 September 1708; and was member of the council from 1716 until his death.

Slare had a large practice in London. In 1709 he organised support for German emigrants from the Palatinate, bringing together John Tribbeko, John Chamberlayne and others. He retired to the country before 1715.

== Later life ==
Slare had religious interests, was a founder member of the Society for Promoting Christian Knowledge (SPCK) and Society for the Propagation of the Gospel in Foreign Parts, and was a friend of John Floyer. In 1714 and 1715 he made benefactions to two church livings. He was one of the Commissioners for Relieving poor Proselytes; the Society for Relieving Poor Proselytes, from 1717 to the end of the 1720s, directed funds mostly to immigrant converts from Catholicism, and was an initiative of Henry Newman of the SPCK.

Anthony William Boehm, a friend, died in his Greenwich home in 1722. Boehm and Slare supplied John Le Neve with materials for his memoir of the Protestant traveller Heinrich Wilhelm Ludolf; through Slare Ludolf had met Edmund Calamy. Slare supported his project to have the New Testament translated into modern Greek, with Henry Hoare, and Sir John Philipps, 4th Baronet. Hoare, Slare and Francis Lee were leaders in the charity school movement in England, and also in close touch with August Hermann Francke and the Pietists.

Slare died on 12 September 1727, in his eightieth year. He was buried in the cemetery adjoining Greenwich churchyard, where an inscription on his gravestone read "Societatis de promovendo Evangelium in partibus transmarinis socius". His sister Jane (died 4 April 1734, aged 80) was buried next to him.

== Works ==
Slare for some years regularly attended at the meetings of the Royal Society, to which he showed experiments on phosphorus, one of which he repeated after dinner at the house of Samuel Pepys. Phosphorus had been one of the chemical directions he had followed in working for Boyle: with Ambrose Godfrey he had prepared white phosphorus, one of the allotropes. The German contact Johann Daniel Kraft was responsible for the introduction of phosphorus in Boyle's work. It was Godfrey who went on to build a reputation on phosphorus. Slare continued to represent the experimentalist tradition in the Royal Society, with Patrick Blair and James Douglas, when the Newtonian and mathematical tendency became more dominant. He formed part of the opposition to Robert Hooke in 1682–3, and later, over lack of experimentation.

With others (Thomas Henshaw, Hooke, Christopher Wren) Slare worked over the findings of Willem ten Rhijne in Asian medicine, after they had been presented to the Royal Society by Haak in 1682. A volume on acupuncture and other topics was then printed in London. Slare himself tried moxibustion using Artemisia vulgaris. He did translation work for the De Historia Piscium of 1686, of manuscripts of the naturalist Leonhard Baldner, for John Ray and Francis Willughby. In the case of a work the Royal Society was sent in 1684, by Johann Kunckel, Slare played the role of extracting some experimental content, to Boyle's eventual satisfaction.

Slare demonstrated the presence of common salt in blood, and supported to some extent the views of John Mayow and Richard Lower on the change of colour of blood in air. He repeated experiments of Robert Boyle with ammoniacal copper salt solutions, in which air was absorbed, with an accompanying change of colour. Like Hooke, Slare was interested in chemical theories that were not Helmontian. He was an early supporter of contagium animatum – an early modern theory of pathogens – in the veterinary context, where it was developed later by Carlo Francesco Cogrossi.

At the request of Sir John Hoskyns, Slare examined in 1713 a number of calculi, which he showed, against a view then common, to be unlike tartar chemically. This was in fact an old line of enquiry, going back to the 1670s and 1680s when Slare and Nehemiah Grew tried reagents on materia medica, and Slare had published a paper on calculi in 1683. Experiments … upon Oriental and other Bezoar-Stones (1715) dismissed the miraculous virtues then attributed to animal calculi. He quoted cases of their inefficiency, and showed that they were unacted on by certain chemical reagents. This pamphlet was replied to at once by "W. … L. …" in A Nice Cut for the Demolisher (by Walter Lynn). Slare suggested chalk as a remedy for acid dyspepsia instead of "Gascoin's powder", a remedy using bezoar stones. With this pamphlet was Vindication of Sugars against the Charge of Dr. Willis, against Thomas Willis. It contained a rejection of the experimental work of Willis, and his view of diabetes, prompted by Thomas Sydenham. Slare praised sugar for its numerous uses, and the sugar trade, and used the sweet taste of breast milk to argue that sugar is suitable for children. He was also an advocate of the breakfast of bread and hot drinks (tea, coffee or chocolate).

A proponent of balneotherapy, Slare praised the waters of Bath, Somerset. In 1713 he showed that the mineral waters of Bad Pyrmont are not acidic, and in 1717 he reprinted his paper, with additions, as An Account … of the Pyrmont Waters, dedicated to Sir Isaac Newton and John Bateman (died 1728), president of the College of Physicians, before whom he had made experiments (28 February 1717), comparing the Pyrmont waters with the then more fashionable ones of Spa. The book was translated into German in 1718 by Georg Ludwig Piderit, and annotated by Johann Philipp Seipp, with criticism of Slare's views. Seipp, however, on publishing a second edition of his own work, Neue Beschreibungen der pyrmontischen Stahl-Brunnen (1719) praised Slare. The Pyrmont waters were to the taste of the king, George I, and had begun to be imported to Great Britain. Slare's work is now regarded as confirming the chemistry of chalybeate spas as alkaline waters.

In an appendix to Perrott Williams's Remarks upon Dr. Wagstaffe's Letter against inoculating the Small-pox (1725), Slare defended inoculation, which had been introduced in England in 1721. He mentioned having attended a son of Sir John Vanbrugh, after inoculation, in May 1723.

== Notes ==
Attribution

This article incorporates text from a publication now in the public domain: Lee, Sidney, ed. (1897). "Slare, Frederick". Dictionary of National Biography. Vol. 52. London: Smith, Elder & Co.
