= Middleton, Warwickshire =

Village and civil parish in Warwickshire, England

Coordinates: 52.582°N 1.740°W

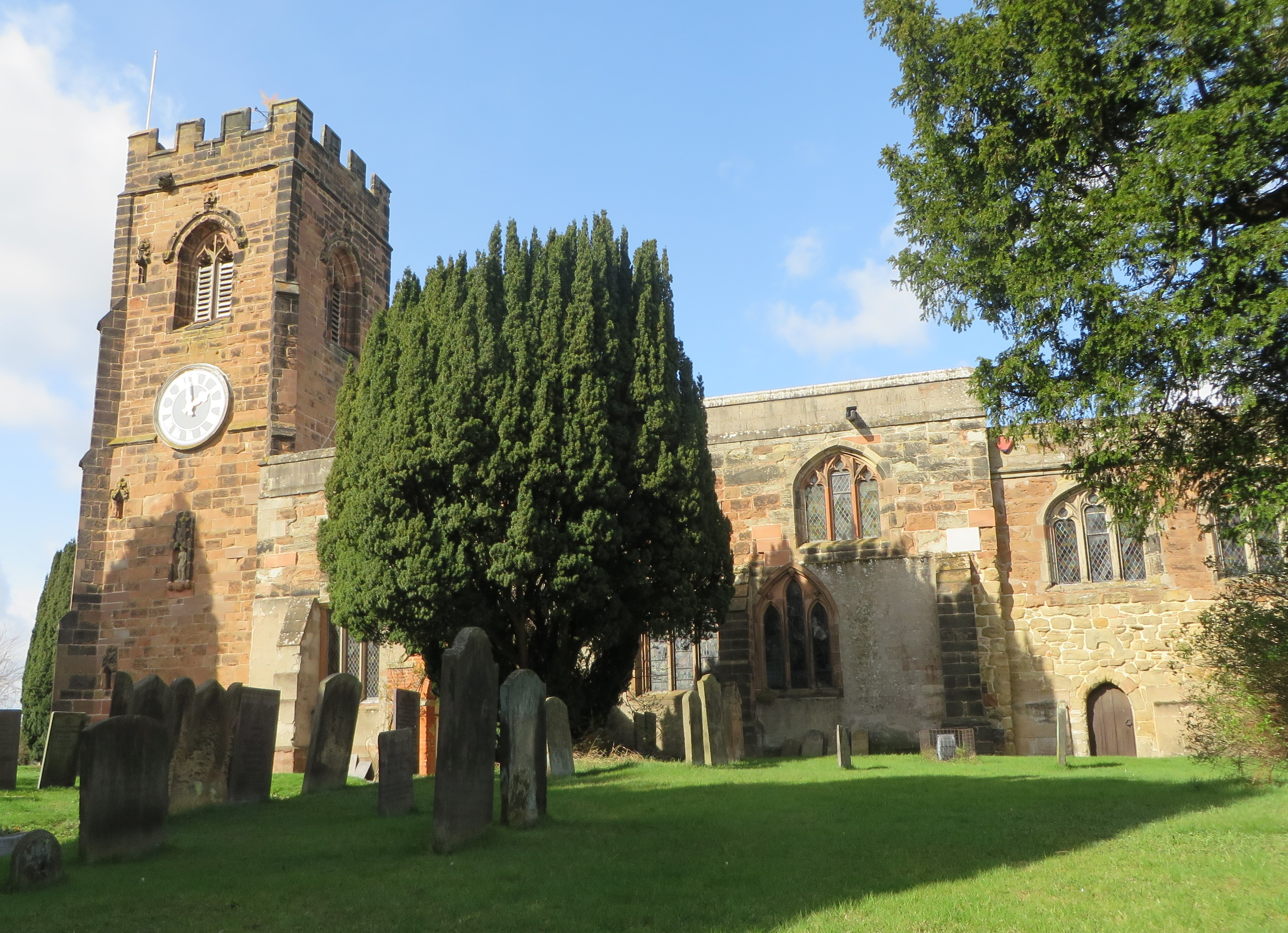
St John the Baptist Church, Middleton

Middleton is a small village and civil parish in the North Warwickshire district of the county of Warwickshire, England. The population of the parish at the 2021 census was 667.

== History ==
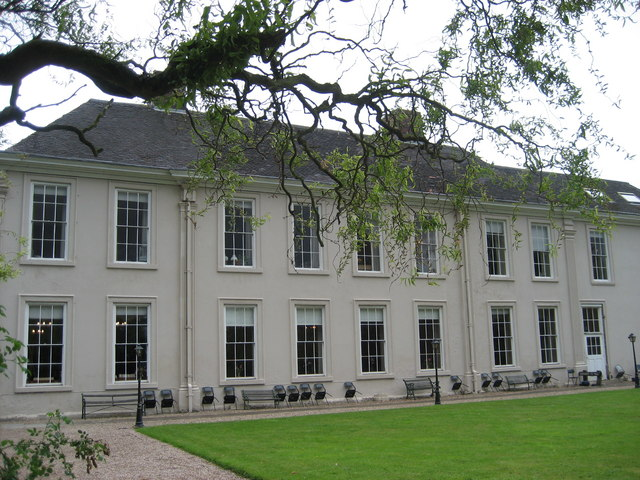
Main wing

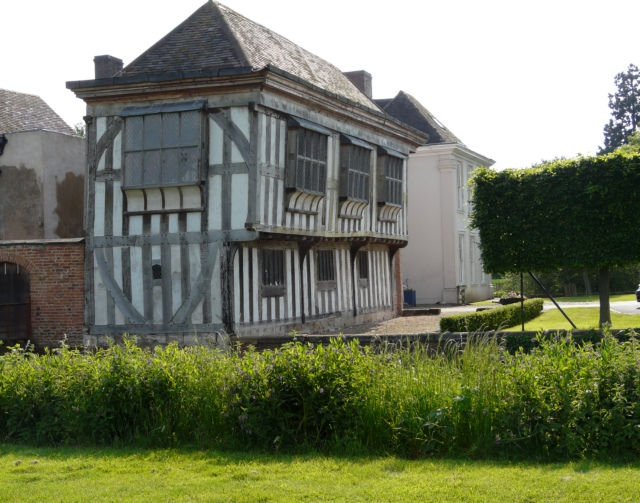
Middleton Hall

At the time of the Domesday Book Middleton was under a Norman Overlord Hugh de Grandmesnil who had several holdings in Warwickshire. When he died it passed to the Marmions of Tamworth. In 1291 the estate was divided into three and Middleton was held by the de Frevilles. In the mid 15th century Sir Richard Bingham married Margaret Willoughb (born Freville) of Nottinghamshire. There is a brass memorial to Sir Richard in the Parish Church. When Margaret died in 1493 she left the estate to her grandson (by her first marriage) Sir Henry Willughby. Ornithologist Francis Willughby was born at Middleton Hall in 1635. The Hall stayed in the family until 1924.

St. John the Baptist Church holds an ornate memorial commemorating Francis Willughby, his parents, Francis senior and Cassandra, and his son, also Francis; this was erected by his second son, Thomas Willoughby. The title of Baron Middleton, of Middleton in the County of Warwick, was created in 1711 by Queen Anne as a hereditary barony in the Peerage of Great Britain for Thomas Willoughby, of Wollaton Hall in the County of Nottingham (1670–1729).

== Recent history ==
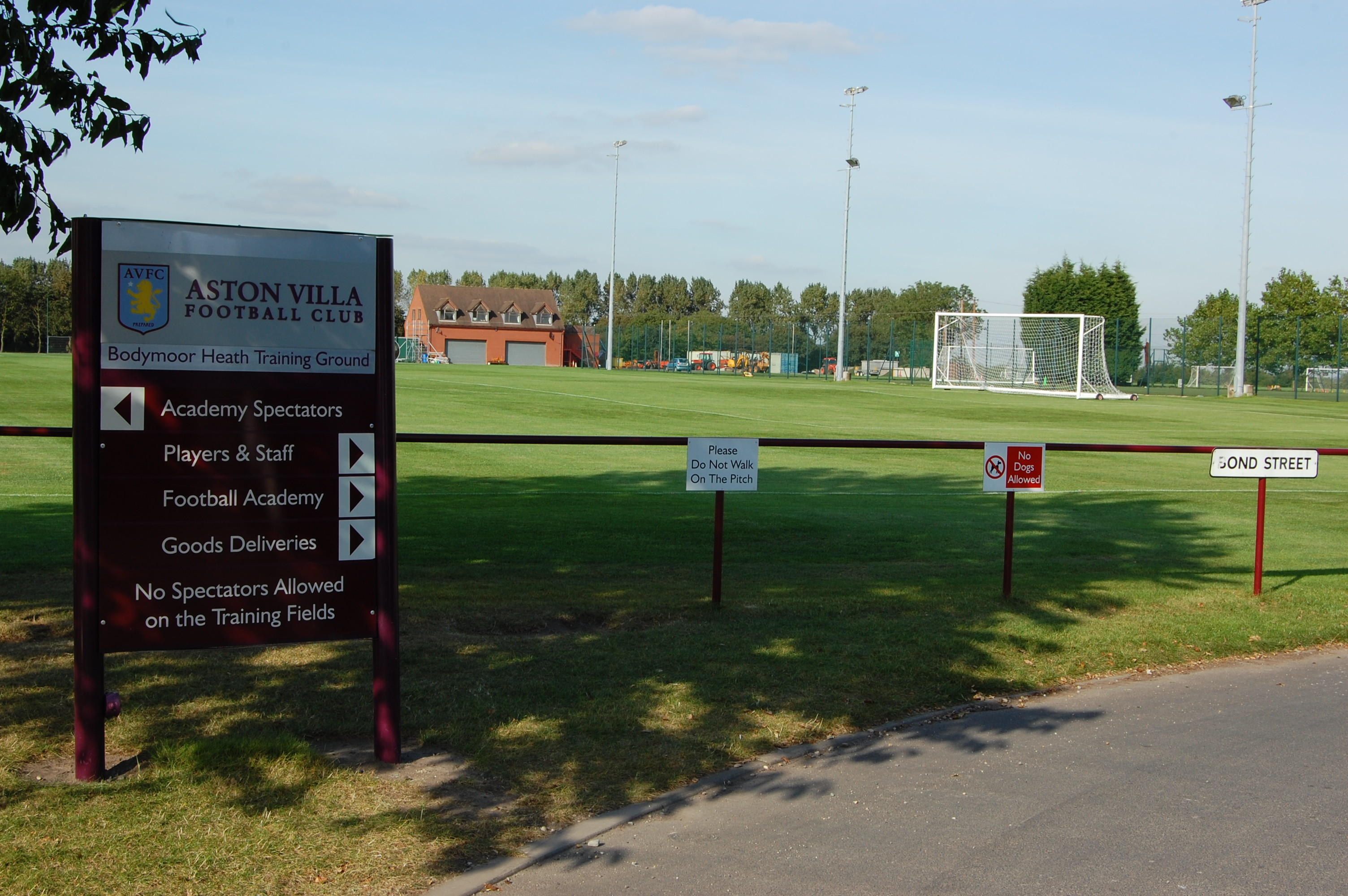
Aston Villa signage at Bodymoor Heath, seen in 2009. Note the tennis courts, behind the goalpost.

By the late 1970s Middleton Hall and the surrounding estate came under the ownership of the Amey Roadstone Construction (ARC) for sand and gravel extraction. The Hall and its outbuildings, with some remains dating back to the Norman period, was in serious danger of being lost. It was saved by the establishment of the Middleton Hall Trust in 1980, a group of volunteers who are restoring the Hall with the help of local authorities and national bodies. ARC have assisted in this by renting at a low rate the Hall and surroundings to the Trust, and by restoring a Tudor period stable block as a craft centre.

By the 1980s Middleton was in the middle of a 'leisure area' with The Belfry golf resort to the south, Aston Villa Football Club's Bodymoor Heath Training Ground to the east, Drayton Manor Theme Park to the north and the M6 Toll being built to the west. Demographic change brought about by the recession of the early 1980s, which saw many local farms and businesses fail, has led to many humble buildings being expanded into luxury homes. Various public entertainment and business sites were created. A children's farm, two garden centres and numerous small industrial units now attract many people from the surrounding urban areas.

In the 1990s one farm diversified into the car boot sale market. This now occupies several fields in the parish throughout the year, alternating between sites at weekends. Gravel excavation at the eastern boundary finished in this decade and two more leisure sites were established, Kingsbury Water Park at Bodymoor Heath and Middleton Lakes RSPB reserve. These have grown into busy centres in the first decade of the 21st century. In March 2010 the Government announced plans for an extension to the HS2 rail link that was already planned from London to Birmingham. This proposal, extending northwards, places a route just 300 yards to the east of the main village. An elevated track, some 80 yards wide and 20 yards high, would take up to 14 passenger trains, capable of 250 mph, an hour. Many local roadways would be affected.
