= Anton Wilhelm Böhme =

German Lutheran royal chaplain

Anton Wilhelm Böhme (English: Anthony William Boehm) (1 June 1673 – 27 May 1722) was a German Lutheran royal chaplain at St. James's Palace in London. He is known as an author and translator.

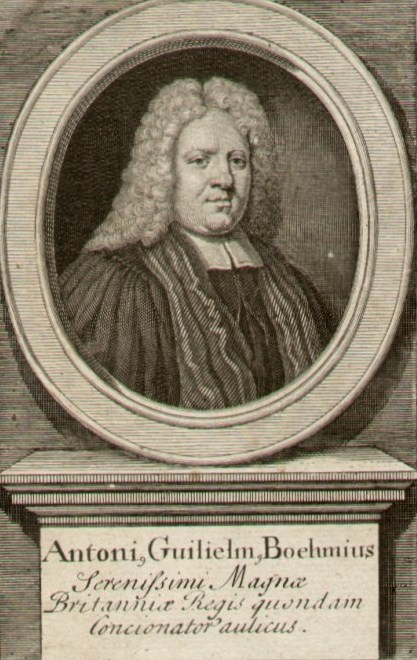
Anton Wilhelm Böhme

== Life ==
He was the son of Anton Böhme, minister of Oesdorf, in Pyrmont, Waldeck, Germany, and was born 1 June 1673. After courses of education at Lemgo and Hameln, he entered in 1693 the then newly founded University of Halle. In 1698 he was called to Arolsen, the seat of the Count of Waldeck, to educate the count's two daughters; but his religious opinions were not acceptable to some of the clergy, and the count let him go.

Böhme received an invitation to become chaplain to the Duchess-dowager of Coburg, but he took up an offer to teach for German families in London. He set out for London 25 August 1701. On his way to England he made the acquaintance of Heinrich Wilhelm Ludolf, secretary to Prince George of Denmark.

After studying English, Böhme opened a school in February 1702. In the early days in London, he was frail and on a small income; but he had met Frederick Slare, who became a lifelong friend. When Prince George, at the request of his wife Queen Anne, introduced the Book of Common Prayer in his own Lutheran chapel, Böhme was recommended by Ludolf as assistant chaplain; his duty was to read the prayers, which the then chaplain found too hard for him. Böhme was chaplain to the Prince from 1705. His first colleague, Irenaüs Crusius, had a call to Stockholm, and was replaced in the German Lutheran Royal Chapel by John Tribbeko, in 1707. The relationship proved fraught, and three years later Tribekko was replaced by Georg Andreas Ruperti. After the death of the Prince in 1708 services continued in the chapel as before; and on the accession of George I in 1714 no alteration was made.

Böhme died at Greenwich 27 May 1722, aged 48. He was buried in Greenwich churchyard, where a monument was erected to his memory.

== Works ==
Böhme was a prolific author. Besides works in German, many translations, and editions of other authors, he published:

- Enchiridion Precum cum Introductione de natura Orationis, 1707, 2nd edition 1715; this Latin work was praised by Isaac Watts for its middle way between set and extempore traditions of prayer.
- A volume of Discourses and Tracts;
- The Duty of the Reformation, 1718;
- The Doctrine of Godly Sorrow, 1720;
- Plain Directions for reading the Holy Bible, 1708, 2nd edition 1721;
- The First Principles of practical Christianity, in Questions and Answers, expressed in the very Words of Scripture, 1708, 2nd edition 1710.

Böhme left a number of works in manuscript. His collected writings of were published at Altona in 1731-2 by Johann Jakob Rambach, professor of divinity at Halle, with a preface and memoirs. These memoirs, translated into English by Johann Christian Jacobi, appeared at London 1735; they included a full list of his publications and manuscripts. A shorter version of the memoirs was in John Wilford's Memorials of Eminent Persons.

== Notes ==
Attribution

This article incorporates text from a publication now in the public domain: Stephen, Leslie, ed. (1886). "Boehm, Anthony William". Dictionary of National Biography. Vol. 5. London: Smith, Elder & Co.
