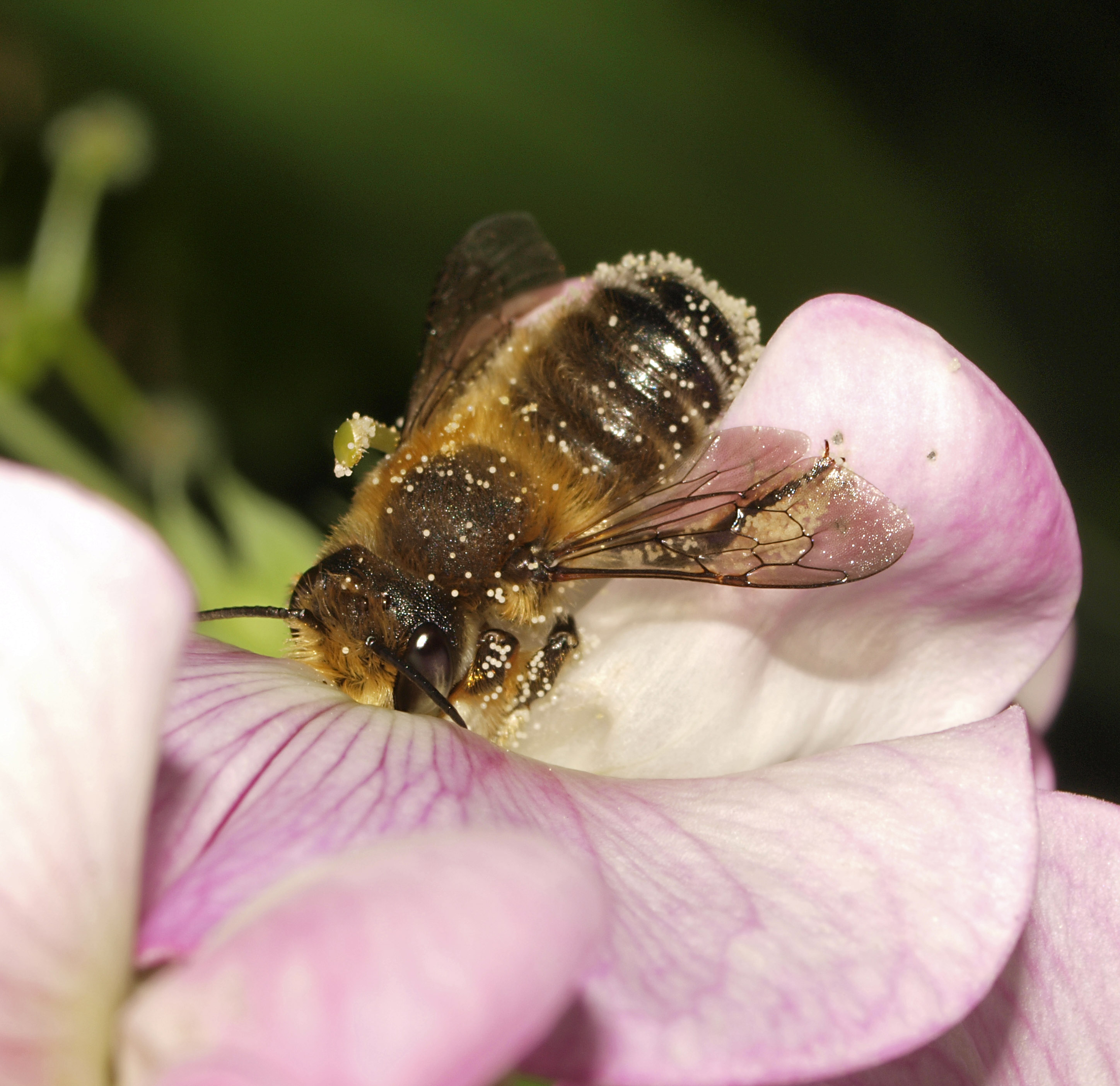
- Male

Scientific classification
- Domain: Eukaryota
- Kingdom: Animalia
- Phylum: Arthropoda
- Class: Insecta
- Order: Hymenoptera
- Family: Megachilidae
- Genus: Megachile
- Species: M. willughbiella

Binomial name
- Megachile willughbiella (Kirby, 1802)

Synonyms
- Megachile atriventris Schenk 1853

= Megachile willughbiella =

Species of leafcutter bee (Megachile)

Megachile willughbiella, Willughby's leaf-cutter bee is a species of bee in the family Megachilidae. It was described by the English entomologist William Kirby in 1802; he named it in honour of the ornithologist Francis Willughby.

== Description ==
Megachile willughbiella is a leafcutter bee found in gardens and brownfield areas especially in cities. The nest is built in soil or in wood; the cells are made of leaves. The species has kleptoparasites from the leafcutting cuckoo bee genus Coelioxys, such as C. quadridentata, C. rufescens and C. elongata. Pollen is collected from a wide variety of flowers including Asteraceae, Fabaceae and Onagraceae, with a preference for Campanulaceae (bellflowers).

== Distribution ==
The species is widely spread across western Europe between Finland, Lithuania and Spain, including Britain and Ireland. In Britain it is one of the most commonly recorded leafcutter species; it is absent from the north Midlands and from mid- and north Wales, but occurs from Cornwall all the way to Inverness, becoming scarcer with latitude.
