= Middleton Hall, Warwickshire =

Building in Tamworth, Warwickshire, England

Middleton Hall
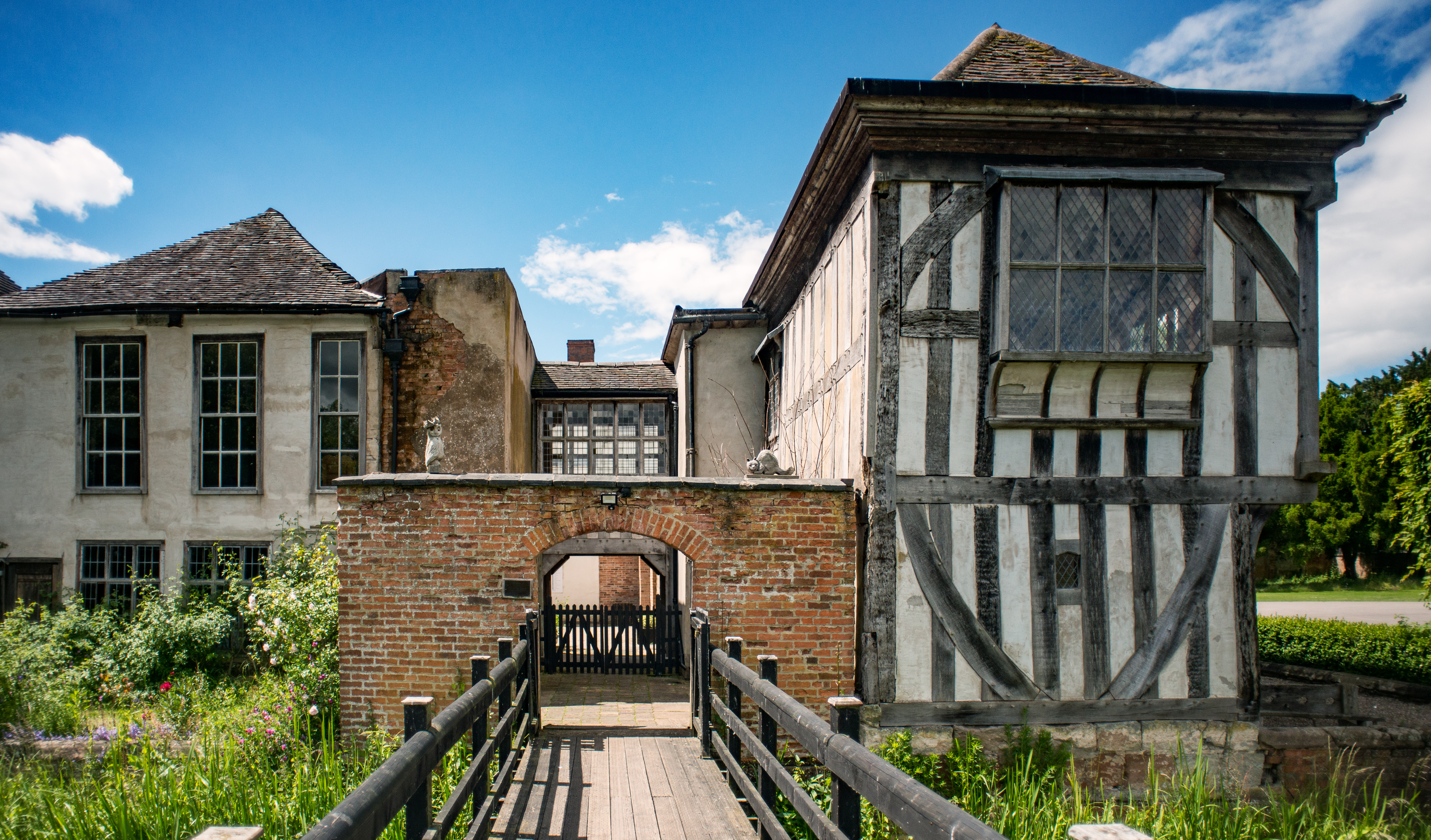
- Middleton Hall viewed from the moat
- Interactive map of Middleton Hall
- Coordinates: 52.58050°N 1.71711°W
- Location: Middleton, Warwickshire, England
- OS grid reference: SP193982

Listed Building – Grade II*
- Official name: Middleton Hall
- Designated: 26 January 1989
- Reference no.: 1365196

Listed Building – Grade II*
- Official name: House approximately 50 metres north east of Middleton Hall
- Designated: 26 January 1989
- Reference no.: 1365197

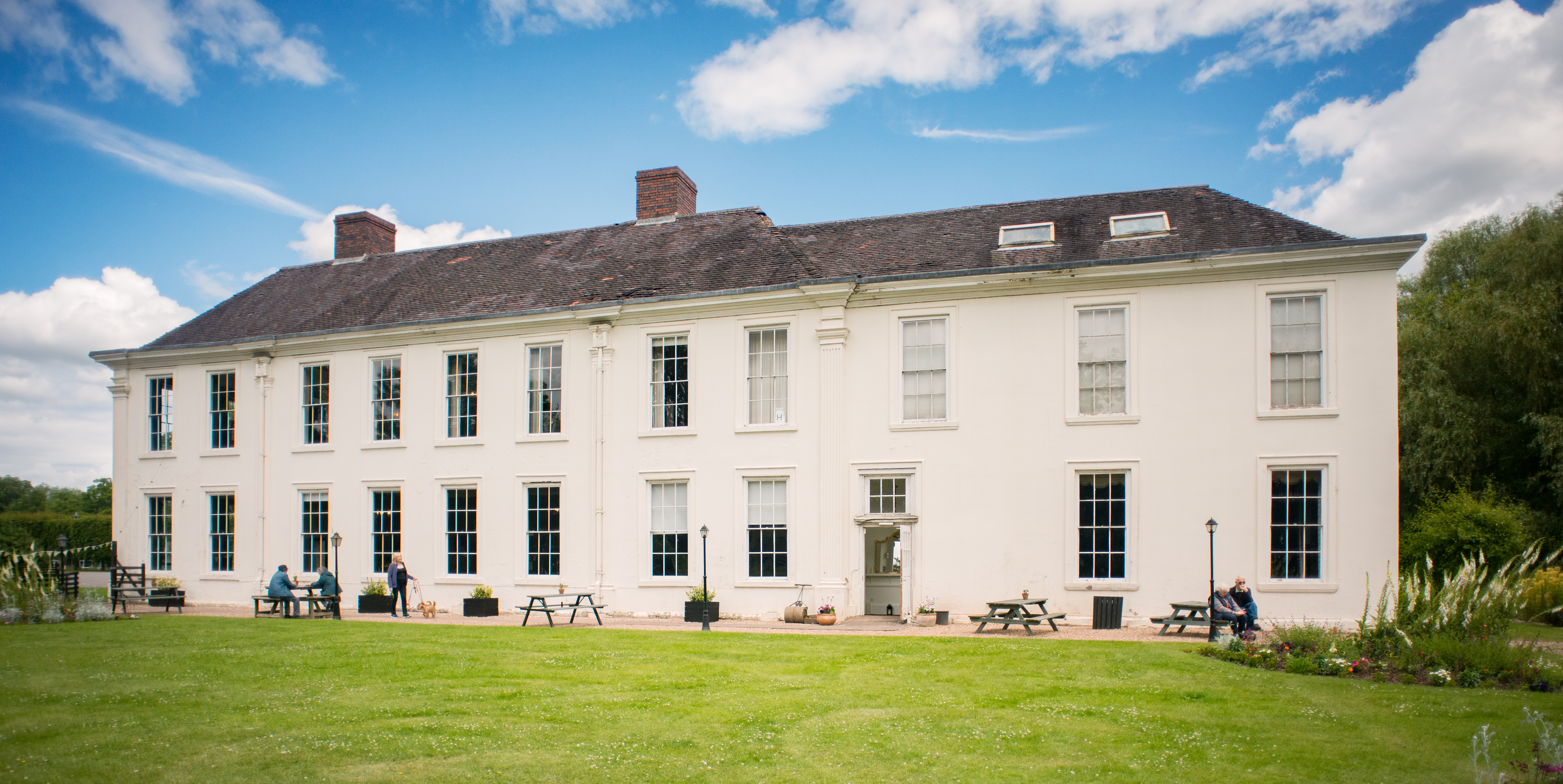
Main wing of hall

Middleton Hall is a Grade II* listed building dating back to medieval times. It is situated in the North Warwickshire district of the county of Warwickshire in England, south of Fazeley and Tamworth and on the opposite side of the A4091 road to Middleton village.

The first residents of the manor of Middleton that have been documented are Palli and Thurgot who were recorded in the Domesday Book. Middleton then passed to the Norman Lord Hugh de Grandmesnil who fought at the Battle of Hastings in 1066. The de Marmion family owned the Middleton manor from 1120 to 1291.

The Manor of Middleton was then held by the Freville family until 1418 and came to the Willoughby family by virtue of the marriage of the heiress Margaret de Freville to Sir Hugh Willoughby. It remained in the family for about 500 years. The Willoughbys also had extensive estates in Nottinghamshire and elsewhere, their principal seat being Wollaton Hall, Nottingham.

In the mid-17th century the hall was the home of Francis Willughby, the mathematician and naturalist, and passed to his descendants the Middleton barons. The hall was also for a time the home of the parson-naturalist John Ray. The Georgian west wing dates from the late 18th century. In 1812 the estates and the barony passed to Henry Willoughby of the Birdsall, Yorkshire branch of the family and Middleton declined in importance in family terms.

The estate comprising the hall and 3,680 acres with sixteen farms was put up for sale in 1924. In November 1924 it was announced that Lord Middleton had sold the estate to James Averill, a farm landlord and industrialist and client of James Styles and Whitlock of Birmingham who would arrange for the farm tenants to be offered their holdings by private treaty. In December, seventy of the 99 lots sold for an aggregate sum of £75,000 (equivalent to £3,942,300 in 2025).

It was sold again in the 1960s to a rubble magnate

The hall was allowed to fall into disrepair over many years and since 1980 has been restored by the independent Middleton Hall Restoration Trust. Much work has been done on the main hall, walled garden, Tudor barn complex (now craft shops) and a 16th-century jettied building, which was close to collapse before restoration commenced. The stables and lodging block are on Historic England's Heritage at Risk Register due their poor condition.

The surrounding 40 acres (160,000 m^{2}) of land include two walled gardens, the largest man-made lake in Warwickshire, much woodland and Middleton Lakes RSPB reserve.
