= St John the Baptist's Church, Middleton =

Church in Warwickshire, England

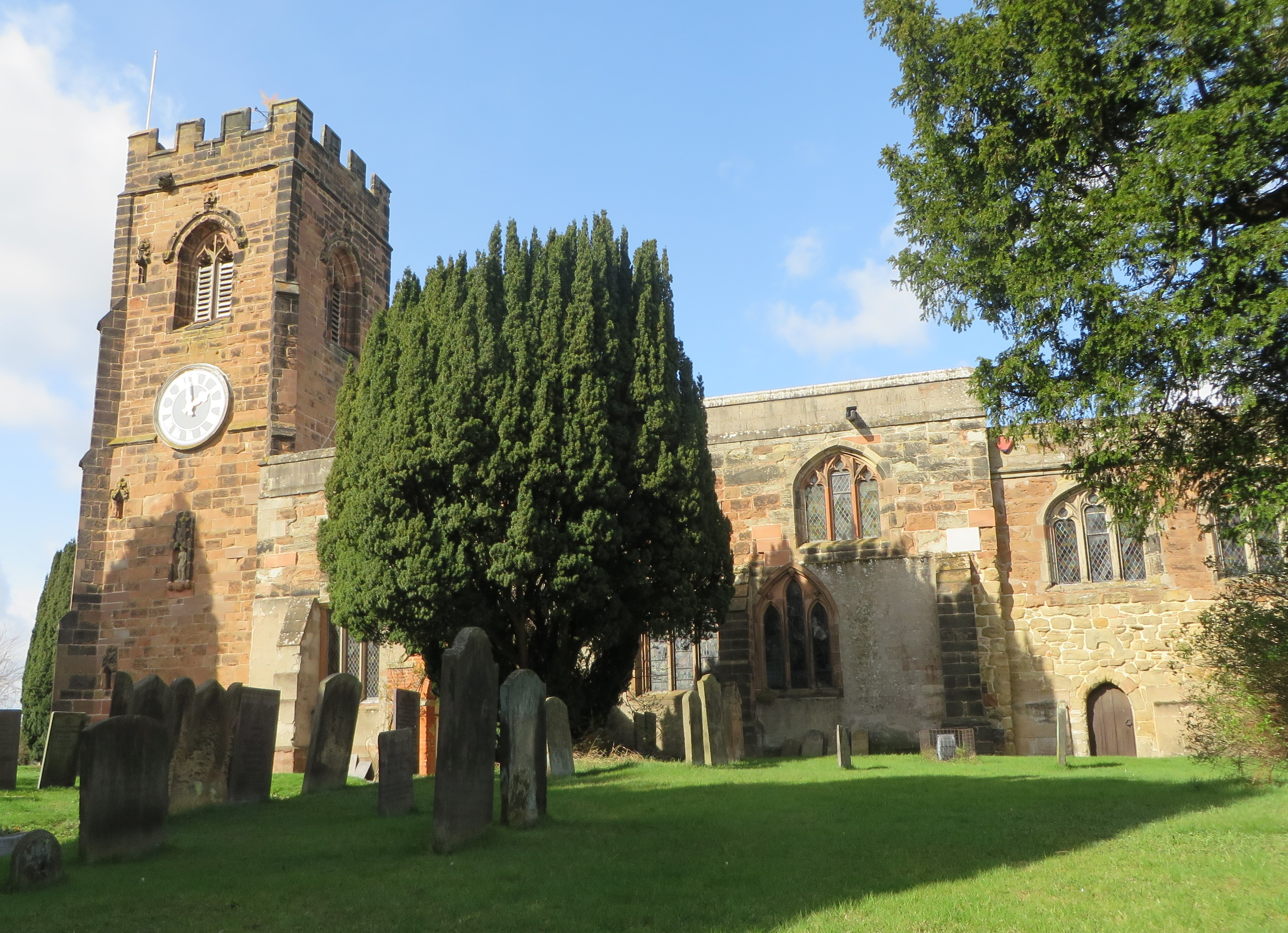
- Interactive map of St John the Baptist's Church, Middleton
- Location: Middleton, Warwickshire, England
- Coordinates: 52.58264°N 1.74049°W

Listed Building – Grade II*
- Official name: Church of St John the Baptist
- Designated: 26 January 1989
- Reference no.: 1034640

Scheduled monument
- Official name: Cross immediately south of St John's Church
- Designated: 20 July 2001
- Reference no.: 1020033

St John the Baptist is an Anglican parish church in Middleton, Warwickshire. It is a Grade II* listed building. The 17th-century ornithologist Francis Willughby is buried there.

The church contains an ornate memorial commemorating Francis, his parents, Francis senior and Cassandra, and his son, also Francis; this was erected by his second son, Thomas Willoughby, 1st Baron Middleton.

== History ==
The church dates from the 12th century, although there may have been an earlier Anglo-Saxon church on the same site, but it was enlarged by the addition of a north aisle in the 13th century, so only the chancel walls and the lower courses of the nave are original. the tower was added in the 15th century, and the church was extensively rebuilt in the 19th century, including adding the east window and plastering inside the church, hiding 14th-century wall paintings.
