= John Christian Jacobi =

German-born translator and dealer in religious books

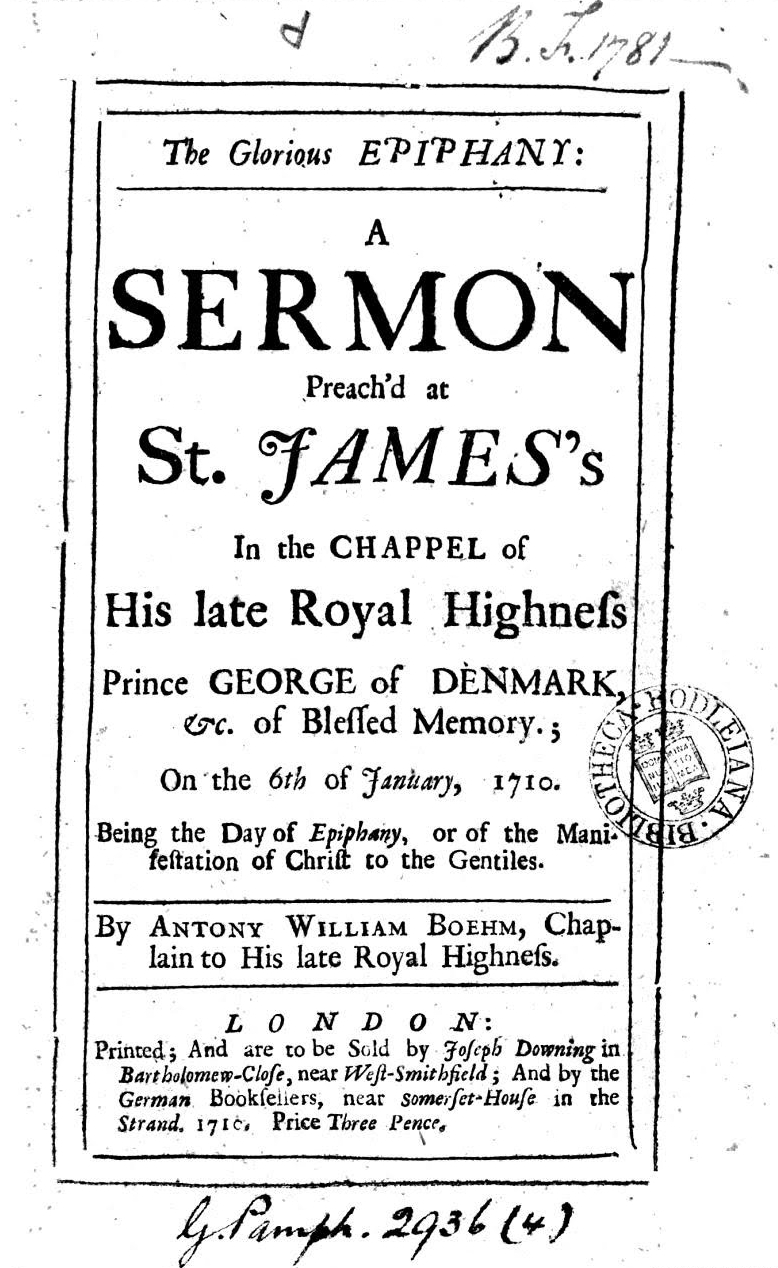
"The Glorious Epiphany", a sermon preached by Anthony William Boehm in 1710 in the Royal German Chapel, where John Christian Jacobi became chapel-keeper in 1714. The sermon is advertised as available for purchase for threepence at Jacobi's bookshop, the German Booksellers near Somserset House on the Strand.

John Christian Jacobi, also Johann Christian Jacobi, (1670-1750) was a German-born translator and dealer in religious books, particularly those connected with Halle Pietism. He served as keeper of the Royal German Chapel, St James's Palace from 1714 until his death.

== Life and works ==
In the 1680s Jacobi attended the University of Halle, one of the main centres of Lutheranism, where the leading Pietist August Hermann Francke set up various educational institutions. While at Halle, he came into contact with English students; and in 1708 he moved to England to start work as a translator and bookseller in London, opening a bookshop near Somerset House in the Strand, London in 1709. He specialised in religious tracts, using his contacts with Francke in Halle and John Downing of the Society for Promoting Christian Knowledge in London. Known as the "German bookseller on the Strand", his bookshop imported German bibles, prayer books and hymnals for the German Lutheran community in London, whose activities centred around the Lutheran chapel of St Mary in Savoy. (Heinrich Eler in Halle was one of his main suppliers.) He produced several English translations including Estrid: An Account of a Swedish Maid, who hath Lived Six Years without Food (1711).

In 1712 Jacobi was already married; the baptism of his son John Owen with Mary Magdalen Jacobi was recorded in June 1712 at St Paul's, Covent Garden. Jacobi's bookshop moved to Southampton Row on the Strand in the same year. In 1714 he was appointed "chapel-keeper" (or verger) of the Royal German Chapel, St James's Palace, which provided Lutheran services for the Hanoverian court. The first chaplain there was Francke's main associate in England, Anthony William Boehm, a close friend of Jacobi. In 1717 he moved his business further along the Strand to the less expensive Exeter Exchange, which housed a number of foreign language bookshops. Although Jacobi had tried to diversify to serve a French readership, he stopped selling books by 1719. His German bookshop was the first of its kind in England and it was 30 years before another one opened in London.

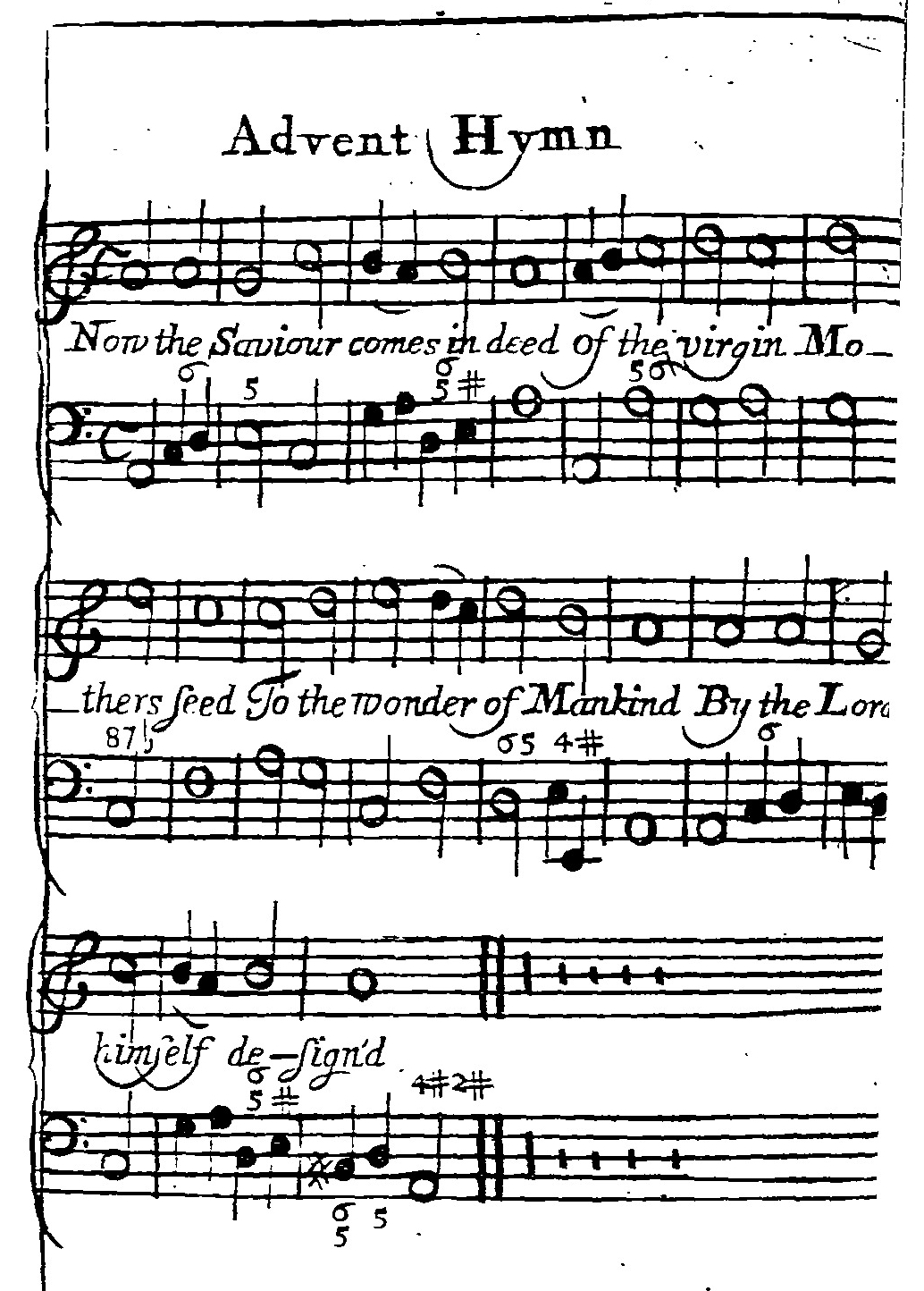
Jacobi's version of Nun komm, der Heiden Heiland opens Psalmodia Germanica, 1722

In 1722 Jacobi published the first edition of his Psalmodia Germanica, or a Specimen of Divine Hymns, Translated from the High Dutch, a collection of English translations of German Lutheran hymns. The dedication to the Royal Princesses Anne, Amalia and Carolina read, "The following sheets exhibit a translation of psalmody, used in the native country of your Royal Highnesses, which (as well as other protestant countries) is blessed with those spiritual hymns, to the frequent use thereof the Apostle doth so solemnly exhort." The Psalmodica also contained two works by Isaac Watts. Three editions of Jacobi's hymnbook appeared between 1722 and 1732. After his death a new edition was prepared in 1765, containing some new translations.

According to Leaver (2005), Jacobi's hymnbook was widely adopted by Lutherans in the New World as the first available English translations; and it was also used by the Moravian Church in England. Podmore (1998) recounts how Jacobi befriended leaders of the Moravian Church during its revival in England: on one of his missions to London in 1735, the leading Moravian churchman David Nitschmann lodged with Jacobi for two months. Later that year—inspired by Nitschmann but discouraged by Friedrich Michael Ziegenhagen, Boehm's successor at the Royal German Chapel in 1722—Jacobi, accompanied by his three daughters, made the journey to Herrnhut in Saxony, where the original Moravian movement had been offered protection. In the same year Jacobi translated the biography of Boehm by Johann Jacob Rambach into English.

In 1748, the second volume of Lives of Martyrs was published with Jacobi's English translation of a French tract on the Huguenot Elias Neau, entitled "A short account of the life and sufferings of Elias Neau upon the galleys, and in the dungeons of Marseilles, for the constant profession of the Protestant religion." Jacobi's translation was published separately in London the following year.

Jacobi was buried at St Paul's, Covent Garden in 1750.

== Gallery ==
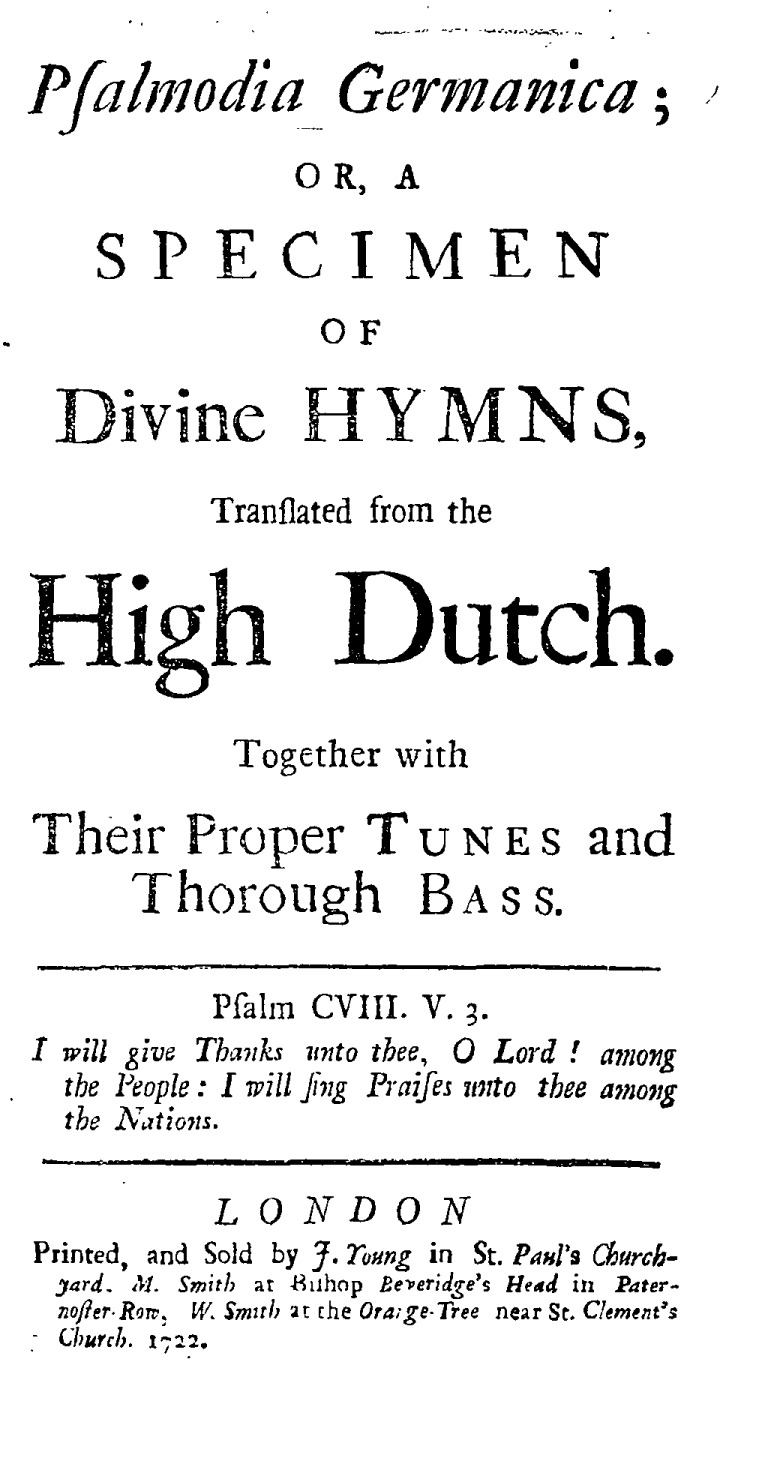
Psalmodia Germanica, first edition, 1722

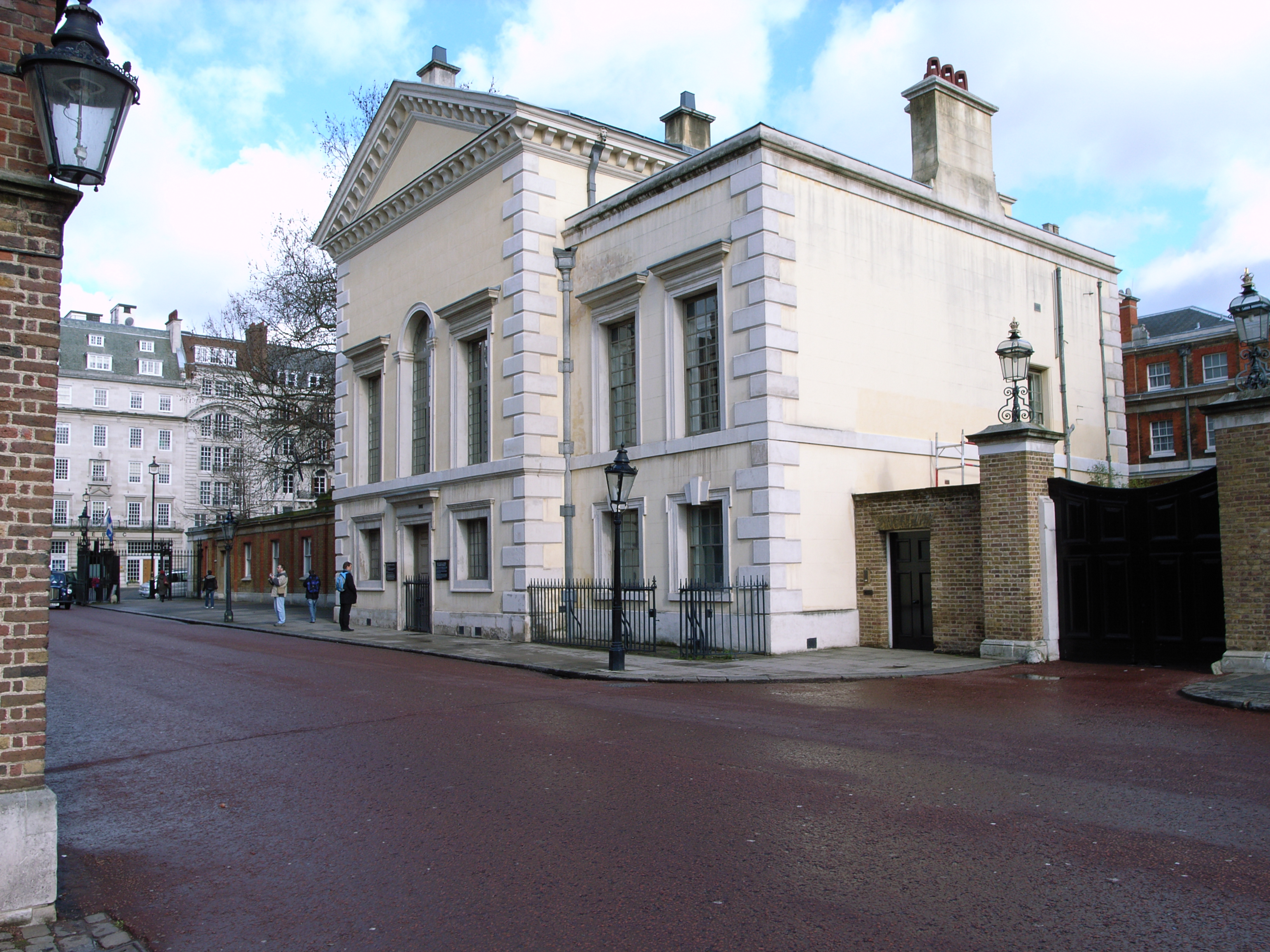
Royal German Chapel, designed by Inigo Jones in 1623-25

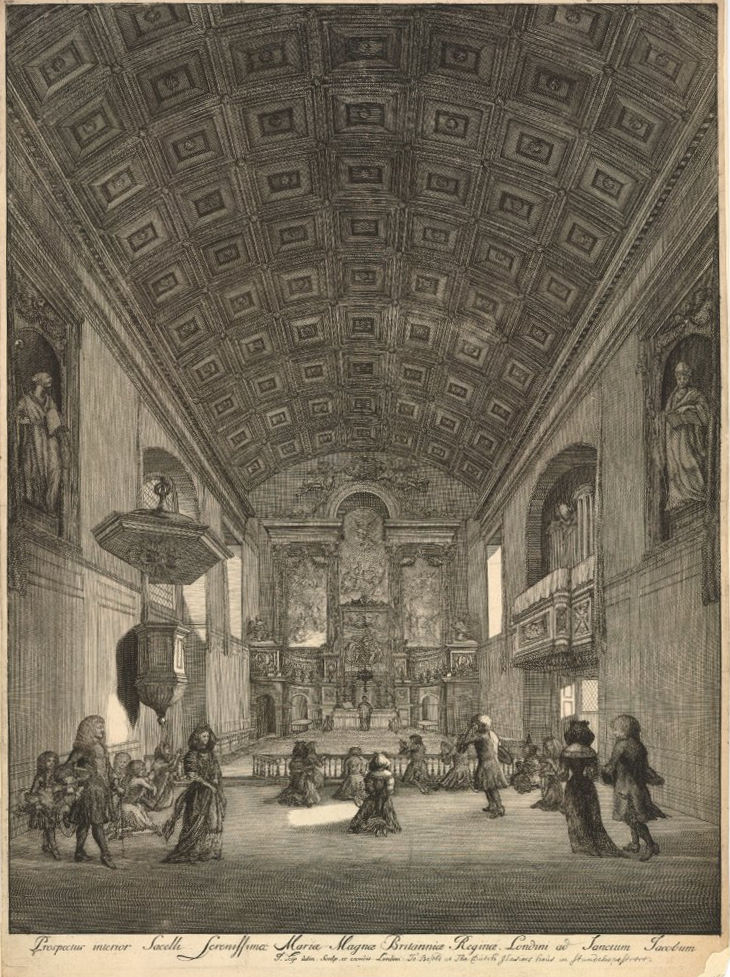
Interior of Royal German Chapel, 1688, refurnished by Christopher Wren in 1682-84

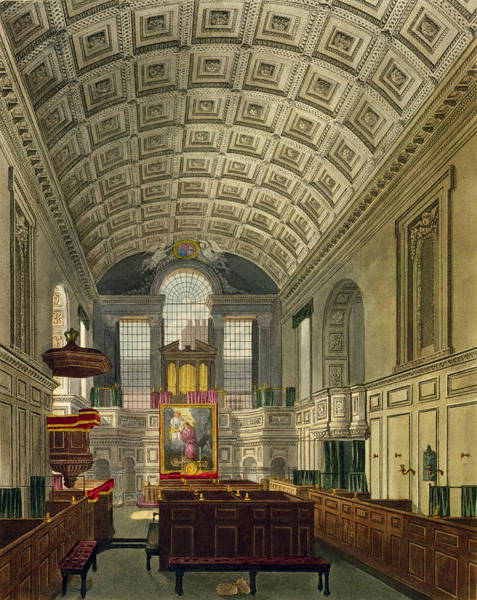
Interior of Royal German Chapel, 1819
