= Leonhard Baldner =

Strasbourg fisherman and naturalist

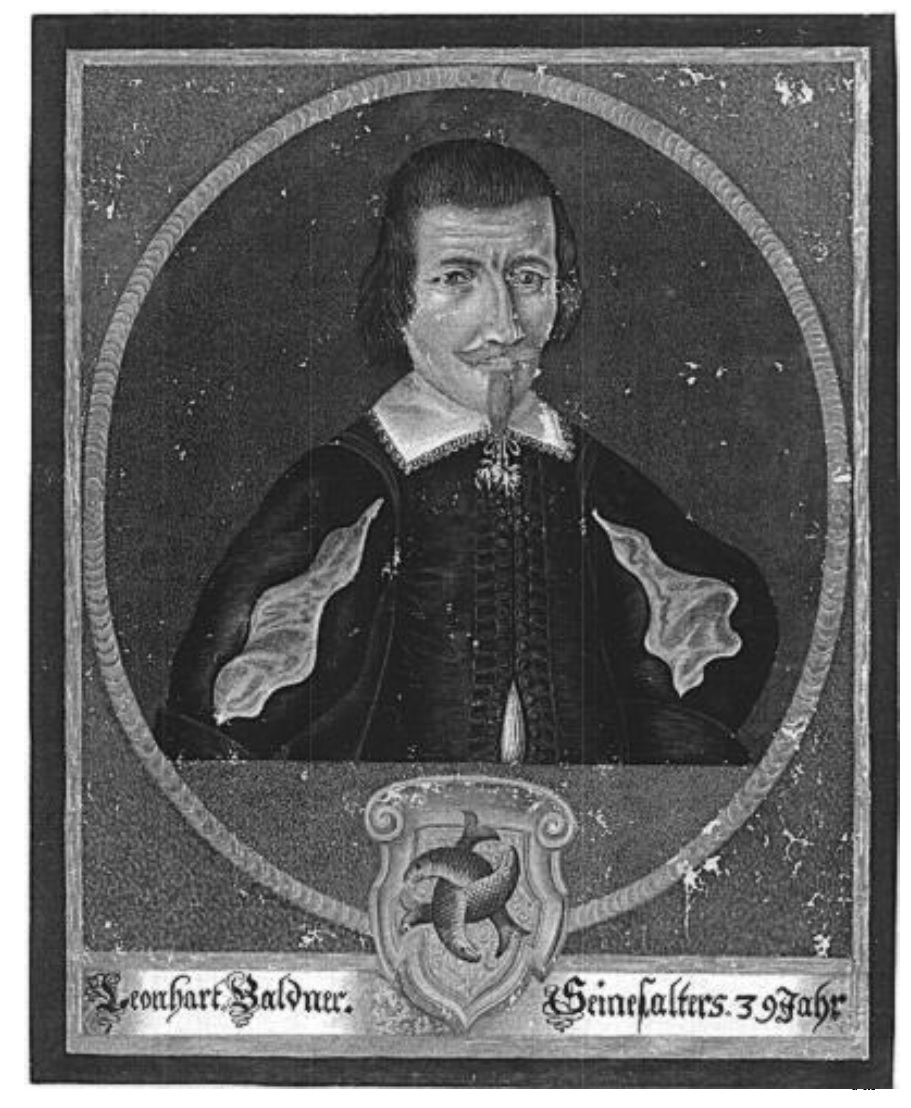
Portrait included in one of Baldner's books dated 1653

Leonhard Baldner or Leonard Baltner (1612 – 1 February 1694) was a Strasbourg fisherman and naturalist who produced a hand-written illustrated book on the fishes, birds, and mammals titled Vogel-, Fisch- und Thierbuch. Only six manuscript copies are now known to exist, two are dated 1653 and the other four 1666. He was one of the early pioneers to use glass aquariums to study fish in life. He was also possibly the first to write on the migration and life-history of the salmon.

== Biography ==
The exact date of birth of Baldner is unknown but he was born in an old fisher family in Strasbourg. He married Salome, daughter of Hans Michael Fries on January 25, 1636, and had four children. He married his second wife Anna Ursula, daughter of a goldsmith, Abraham Sprengel in 1650 and they had four children. He worked as a toll collector, later a forester and then a forest manager. After the death of his second wife, he married Barbara, daughter of Benedictus Grossen, a professor of Hebrew. They too had four children of whom the youngest son, Andreas born in February 1673 transcribed the manuscripts of his father. Baldner died on February 1, 1694 and is buried in the Saint-Urbain cemetery in Strasbourg.

== The bird, fish, and animal book (1666) ==
The original manuscript drawn and written by the artist was inherited by Baldner's youngest son who had it until 1687. It was then purchased by organ builder Silbermann who donated it to the city of Strasbourg. The copy was destroyed on the night of August 24, 1870, during a siege by the Prussians. A facsimile edition of Baldner's manuscript was published by Robert Lauterborn in 1903 although there are slight differences between the plates among the various surviving manuscript editions. It included three parts; the first on birds included 68 species while the second dealt with 45 fishes and crustaceans. The third part included quadrupeds and other animals. His writings were based on personal observation and he did not rely on reports by others. He hired a Strasbourg artist, Johann Georg Walther, to illustrate the book. At least one and probably two copies of the book were obtained by Francis Willughby in 1663. The German text was translated into English for Willughby and his collaborator John Ray by Frederick Slare.

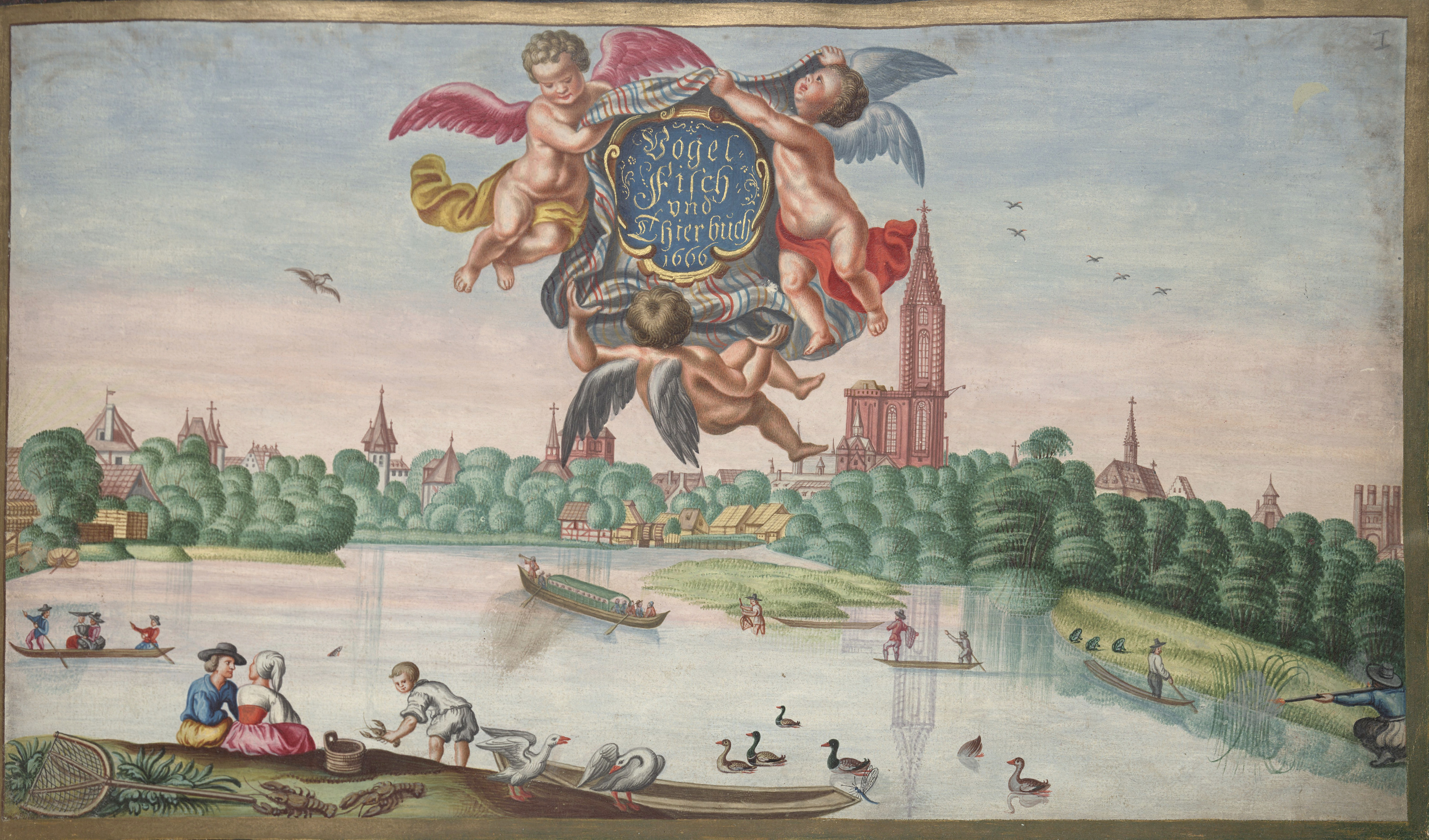
Cover page

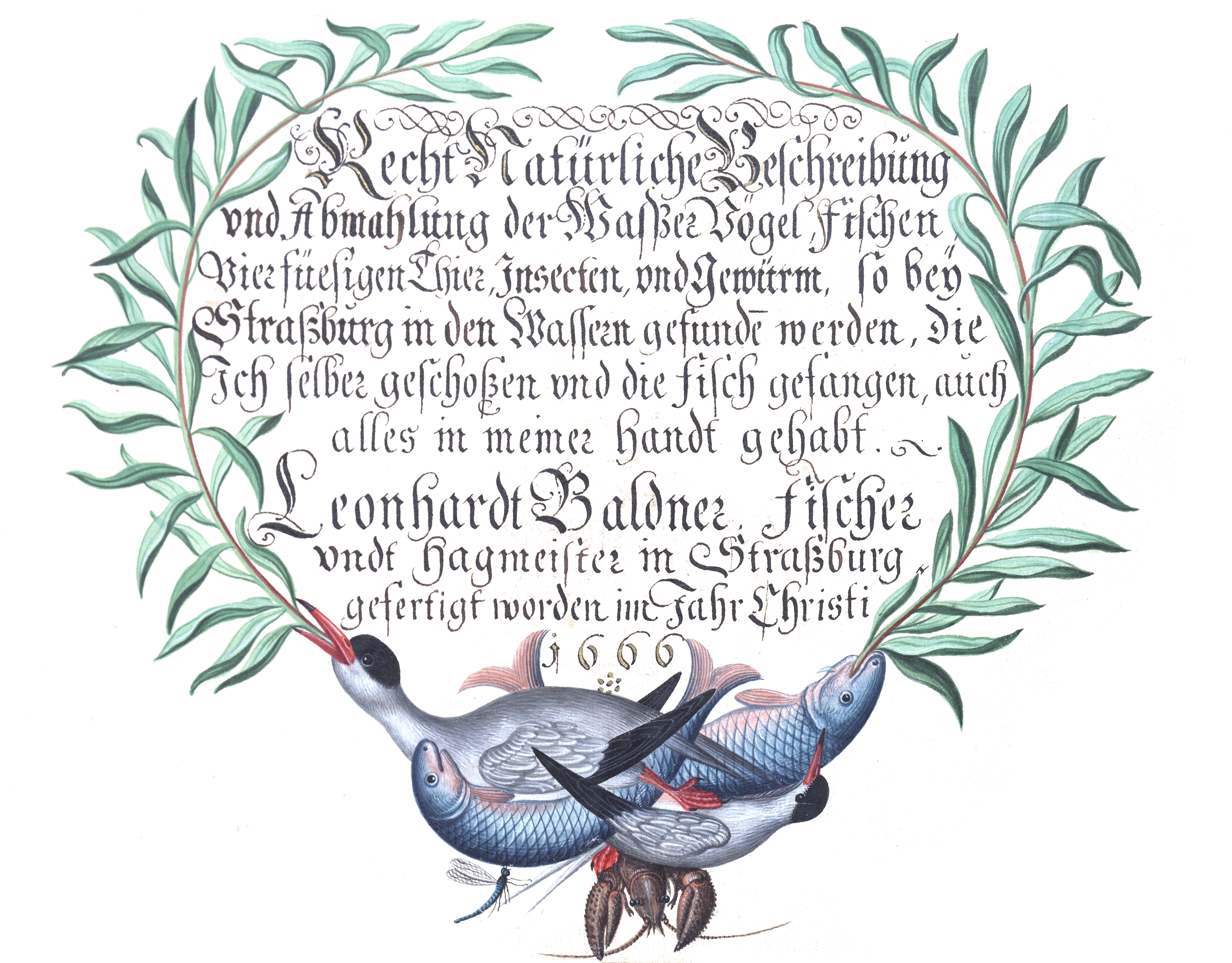
Title

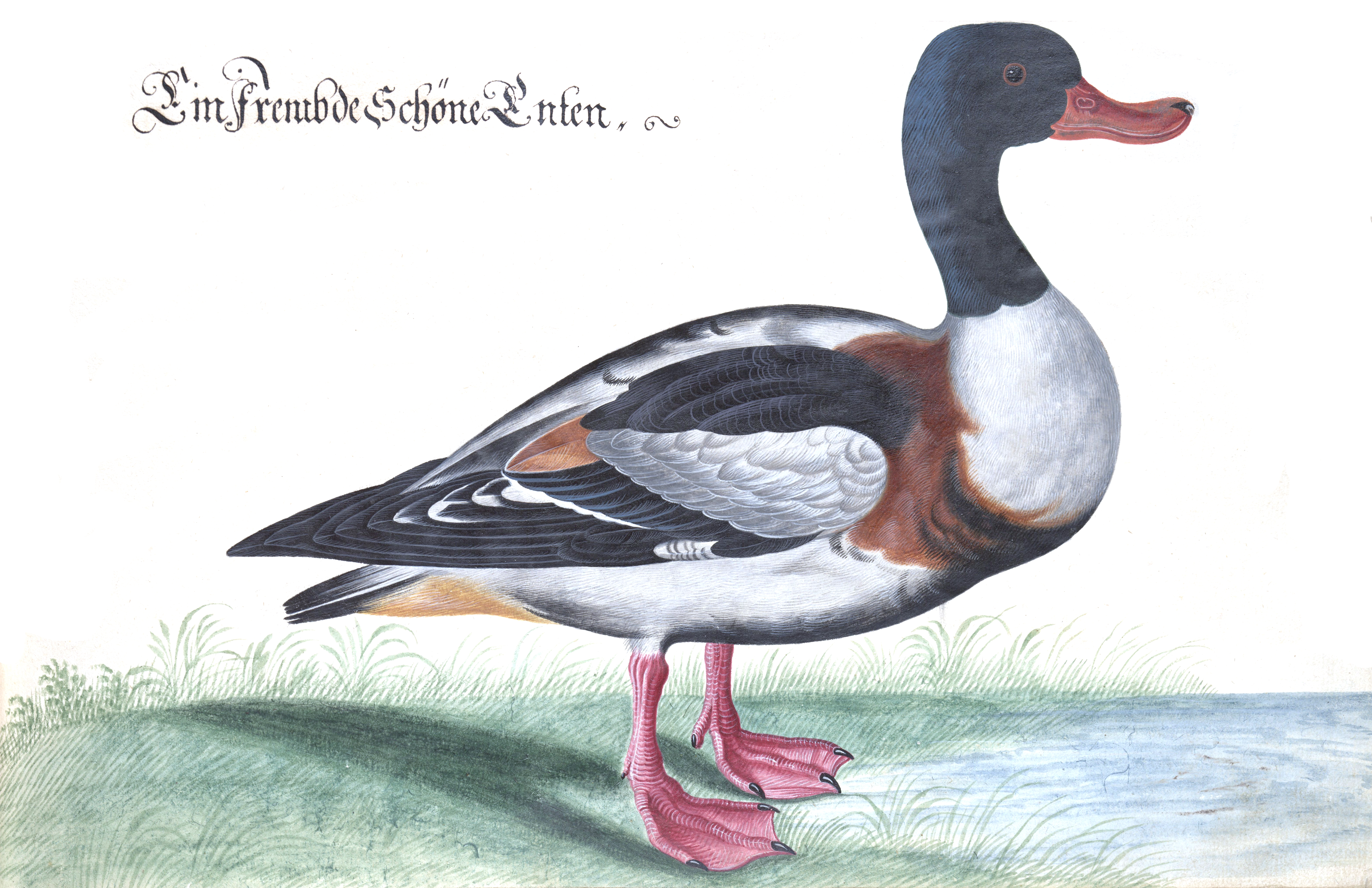
Common shelduck

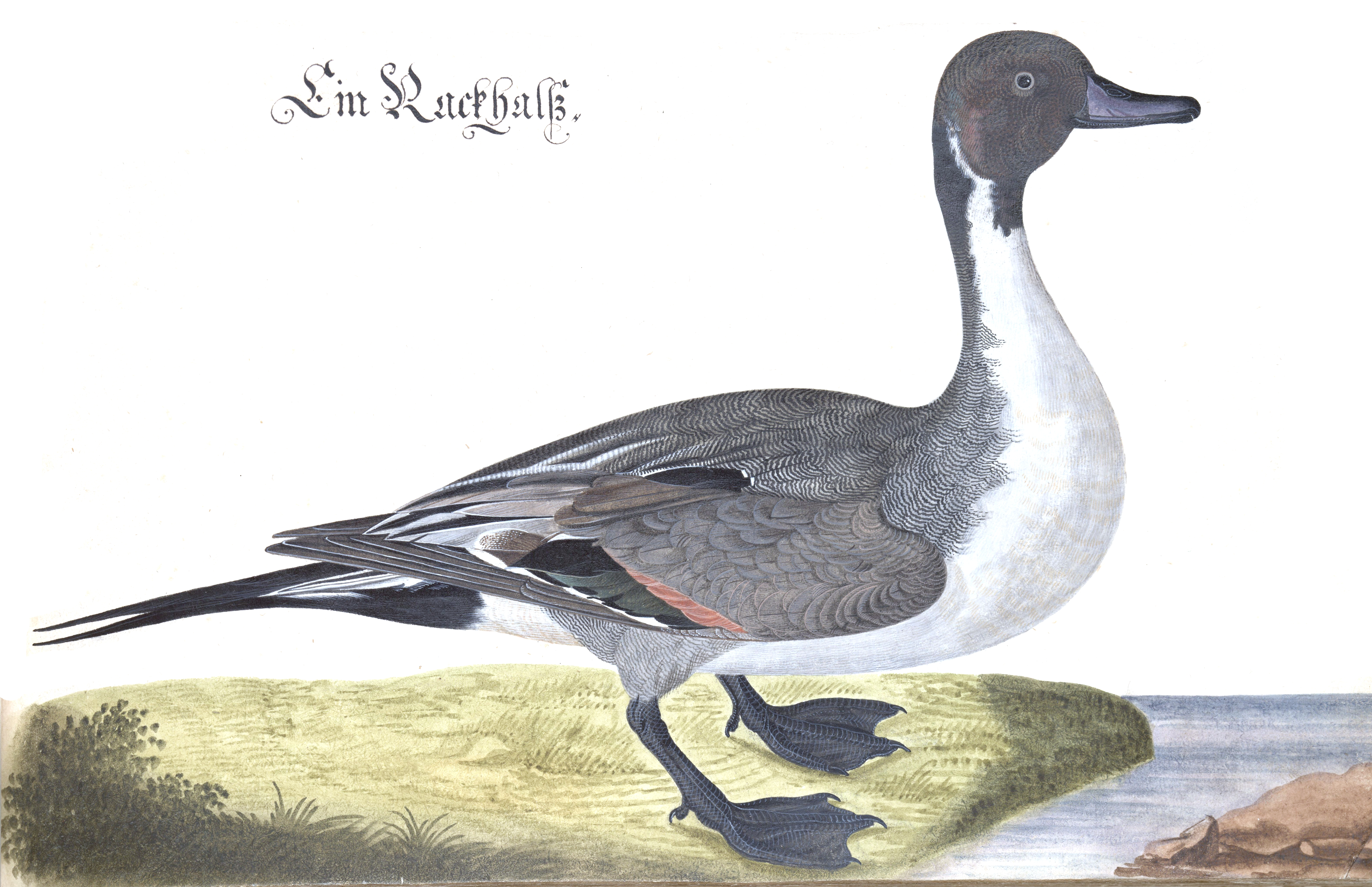
Pintail
