= Middleton Lakes RSPB reserve =

Nature reserve in the United Kingdom

Middleton Lakes
- Interactive map of Middleton Lakes
- Location: Middleton, Warwickshire, England
- Coordinates: 52.5885°N 1.7038°W
- Area: 160 hectares (400 acres)
- Created: 19 May 2011
- Operator: RSPB
- Website: www.rspb.org.uk/days-out/reserves/middleton-lakes

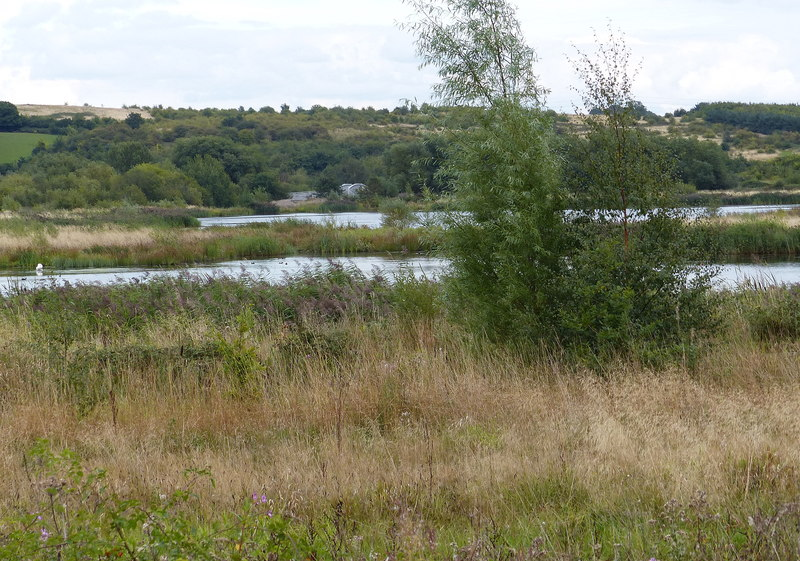
Middleton Lakes RSPB reserve

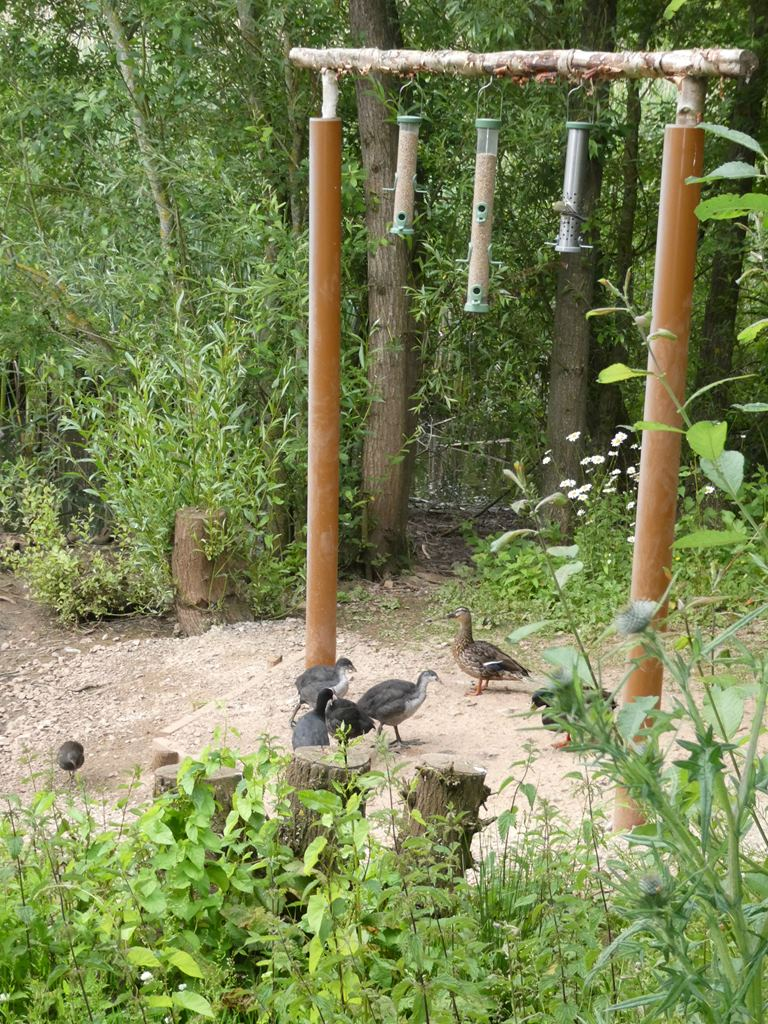
Bird feeders at the reserve

Middleton Lakes RSPB reserve is a 160 hectares (400 acres) nature reserve, formally opened on 19 May 2011, created and run by the Royal Society for the Protection of Birds at Middleton, Warwickshire, England, just south of Tamworth. The Northern part of the reserve lies in Staffordshire, yet the reserve is only a few minutes from the outskirts of Birmingham.

Much of the site was, until its acquisition by the RSPB in 2007, a gravel quarry, operated by Hanson Aggregates. The site was formerly referred to, in birding literature, as Fishers Mill- (Warwickshire), Drayton Bassett- (Staffordshire) and Dosthill- (to the East) -Lakes, -Pools, -Pits or -Gravel Pits.

== Layout ==
The reserve lies to the rear of Middleton Hall, whose catering and toilet facilities are available to reserve visitors. The River Tame flows Northwards through the reserve, some miles downstream from RSPB Sandwell Valley and not far from the West Midland Bird Club's Ladywalk Reserve and Kingsbury Water Park. The water ends up, via the Trent and Humber, in the North Sea.

The Birmingham and Fazeley Canal runs through the reserve, West of the river and roughly parallel to it. It separates the flooded and re-modelled former gravel pits to the East from an area of ancient woodland and former agricultural fields. The canal is crossed by Fishers Mill Bridge, on the county border. A public bridleway also runs through the Western half of the reserve, roughly east–west, as does a stream, Langley Brook, which rises in Sutton Coldfield and flows into the Tame on the reserve.

South of the main pools, is an area of meadowland. A smaller meadow near the visitor carpark is set aside for children's play.

Some pools East of the river (sometimes known as Dosthill North) are also part of the reserve, and a public right of way to them and the nearby village of Dosthill, in Staffordshire, also exists, although the public bridge over the river collapsed and is awaiting replacement.

There are four established walking trails, varying from 500 m to 3 km (1.9 mi) in length, with three purpose-built viewing platforms and a viewing screen. The RSPB plans to erect a bird hide at the northern end of the reserve, and later to provide a visitor centre.

Vehicular access for visitors is from Bodymoor Heath Lane, alongside Aston Villa's Bodymoor Heath Training Ground, some distance south of the reserve.

== Management ==
The quarry was redeveloped as a reserve in conjunction with Hanson and Staffordshire County Council. Islands and spits were created in the former gravel pits. Ten hectares of Willow were removed and the edges of pools re-profiled to a gentle slope of 1:30, instead of the 1:3 used during quarrying, to provide greater areas of mud and thus appeal to wading birds. The large meadow is grazed by a herd of English Longhorn cattle, ensuring ideal conditions for nesting skylarks and wild flowers.

== Wildlife ==
The area is regionally important for overwintering wildfowl such as common pochard, tufted duck and smew. Other notable bird species include lesser spotted woodpecker, Eurasian bittern, barn owl, short-eared owl, little egret, marsh harrier and Cetti's warbler. Grey herons breed in a heronry near the play meadow, with up to 100 individuals present.

Even before the establishment of the reserve, the gravel pits were known for their attraction to breeding, passage migrant and vagrant birds. In the latter category, a least sandpiper and a pectoral sandpiper visited for overlapping periods in May 2002. More recently, the reserve has been visited by rarities including glossy ibis, cattle egret, and great white egret.

Otters are also present, as are a total of over 1,000 other animal plant and fungus species.

The RSPB's targets include attracting bearded reedling, northern lapwing, common redshank and common snipe to breed, or to do so in greater numbers.

== Features ==
Point	Coordinates (links to map & photo sources)	Notes
Fishers Mill Bridge	52.587568°N 1.705529°W	Staffordshire/Warwickshire border
Main pools	52.5925°N 1.7031°W	Staffordshire/Warwickshire
Dosthill North pools	52.5931°N 1.6960°W	Staffordshire
Meadow	52.58233°N 1.70199°W	Warwickshire
Play meadow	52.58188°N 1.714270°W	Warwickshire
Access from Bodymoor Heath Lane	52.567397°N 1.718134°W	Warwickshire
Vewpoint; planned bird-hide	52.59695°N 1.70100°W	Staffordshire
