= Heinrich Wilhelm Ludolf =

German Pietist, secretary to Prince George of Denmark, and ecumenical traveller

Heinrich Wilhelm Ludolf (20 December 1655 – 25 January 1712) was a German Pietist, secretary to Prince George of Denmark, and ecumenical traveller. He is known also as a linguist.

== Life ==
Ludolf was the nephew of Hiob Ludolf the linguist. He acted as a Danish and as an English diplomat. A friend of August Hermann Francke, he travelled to Russia in the 1690s. He had persuaded Francke that the territories related to the Eastern Orthodox Church were important for the future. Gottfried Leibniz saw the importance of Ludolf's efforts on an even larger scale, bridging the gap to China.

Ludolf was also one of the founders of the Society for Promoting Christian Knowledge in London, and with Anton Wilhelm Böhme linked it to Francke's organisations in Halle.

== Works ==
Ludolf's Grammatica Russica was published at Oxford in 1696. This Russian grammar had an introduction that showed, among other remarks, that Russian-speakers themselves distinguished between the spoken Russian language, and Church Slavonic.
