= Francis Willughby =

English ornithologist and ichthyologist

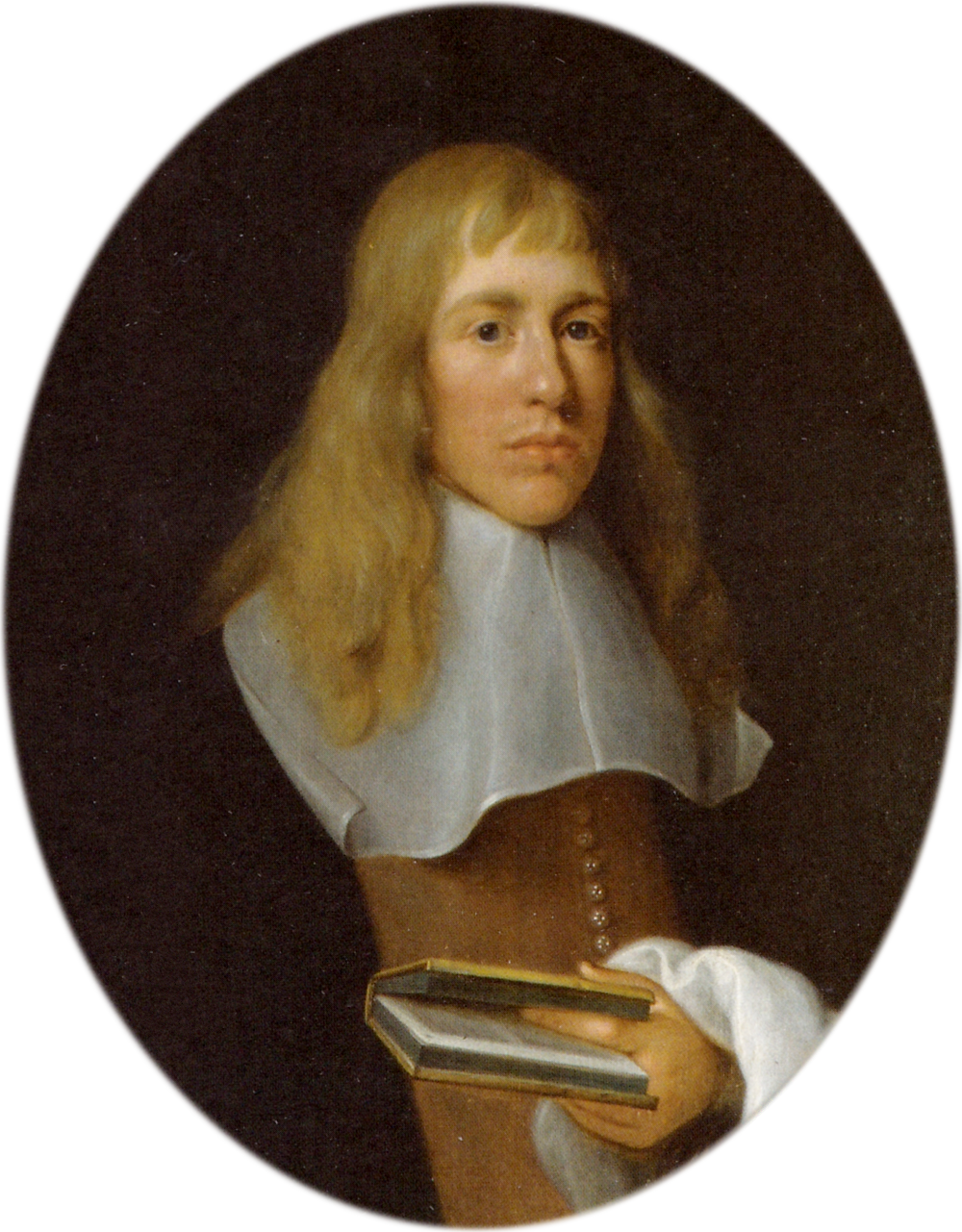
- Portrait between 1657 and 1660
- Born: 22 November 1635; Middleton Hall, Warwickshire, England
- Died: 3 July 1672 (aged 36); Middleton Hall, Warwickshire, England
- Resting place: St John the Baptist's Church, Middleton, Warwickshire
- Education: Trinity College, Cambridge
- Known for: Ornithologiae Libri Tres
- Spouse: Emma Barnard (m. 1668)
- Relatives: Thomas Willoughby, 1st Baron Middleton (son); Cassandra Willoughby, Duchess of Chandos (daughter)
- Scientific career
- Fields: Ornithology, ichthyology

Francis Willughby (sometimes spelt Willoughby, Latin: Franciscus Willughbeius) (Note: Willughby favoured that spelling, but other members of the family, before and after, often used "Willoughby".) FRS (22 November 1635 – 3 July 1672) was an English ornithologist, ichthyologist and mathematician, and an early student of linguistics and games.

He was born and raised at Middleton Hall, Warwickshire, the only son of an affluent country family. He was a student at Trinity College, Cambridge, where he was tutored by the mathematician and naturalist John Ray, who became a lifetime friend and colleague, and lived with Willughby after 1662 when Ray lost his livelihood through his refusal to sign the Act of Uniformity. Willughby was elected as a Fellow of the Royal Society in 1661, then aged 27.

Willughby, Ray, and others such as John Wilkins were advocates of a new way of studying science, relying on observation and classification, rather than the received authority of Aristotle and the Bible. To this end, Willughby, Ray and their friends undertook a number of journeys to gather information and specimens, initially in England and Wales, but culminating in an extensive tour of continental Europe, visiting museums, libraries and private collections as well as studying local animals and plants. After their continental tour, he and Ray lived and worked mainly at Middleton Hall. Willughby married Emma Barnard in 1668 and the couple had three children.

Willughby had suffered bouts of illness over the years, and eventually died of pleurisy in July 1672, aged 36. His premature death meant that it fell to Ray to complete the works on animals they had jointly planned. In due course, Ray published books on birds, fish and invertebrates, the Ornithologiae Libri Tres, Historia Piscium and Historia Insectorum. The Ornithology was also published in an expanded form in English. The books included innovative and effective ways of classifying animals, and all three were influential in the history of life science, including their effect on subsequent natural history writers and their importance in the development of Linnaeus's binomial nomenclature.

== Early life ==
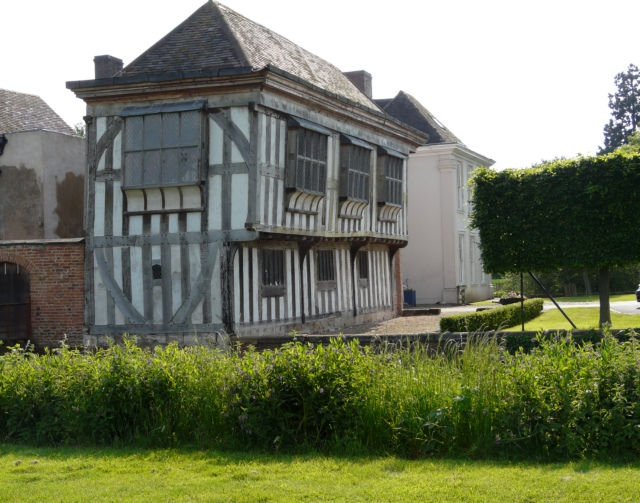
The Willughby family home at Middleton Hall, Warwickshire (Note: Middleton Hall is a grade II* listed building. The depicted house is of 16th century origins with 17th-century plastering and some later brickwork.)

Francis Willughby was born at Middleton Hall, Warwickshire, on 22 November 1635, the only son of Sir Francis Willoughby and his wife Cassandra (née Ridgeway). His grandfathers were Sir Percival Willoughby of Wollaton Hall, and Thomas Ridgeway, 1st Earl of Londonderry. The family were affluent gentry, whose main seat, inherited by Francis, was Wollaton Hall, now in Nottingham. The younger Francis studied at Bishop Vesey's Grammar School, Sutton Coldfield and Trinity College, Cambridge. He appears to have read widely, his library at his death containing an estimated 2,000 books, including literary, historical and heraldic works as well as natural science volumes.

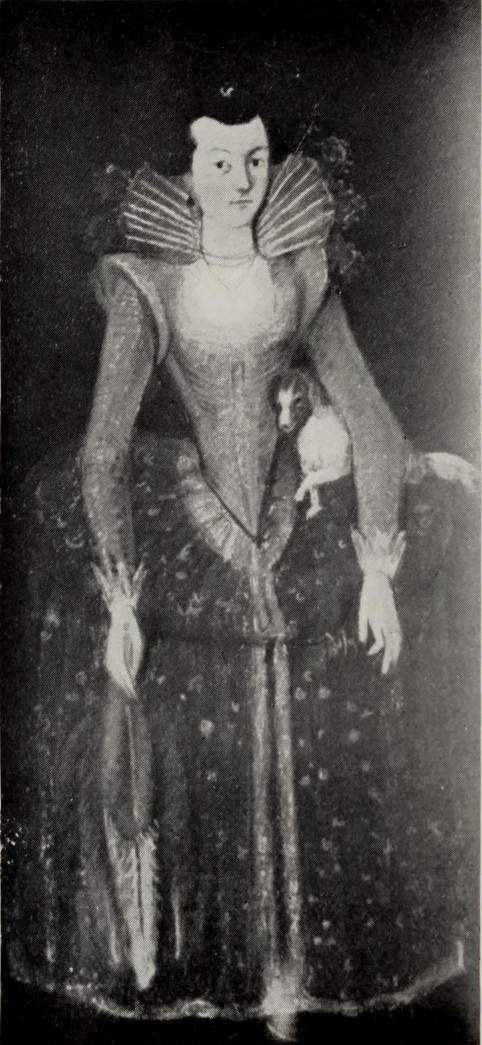
Lady Cassandra Ridgeway, Willughby's mother

Willughby commenced his studies at Trinity aged 17 as a Fellow-commoner. (Note: A Fellow-commoner paid double tuition fees in return for privileges such as dining with the College Fellows.) His tutor was James Duport, who shared the Willughbys' royalist sympathies in the English Civil War. John Ray, (Note: Originally Wray, which he used consistently until 1670 when he changed to Ray for ease of Latinisation as Joannes Raius.) then a mathematics fellow at Trinity, arranged for his student Isaac Barrow to teach Willughby that subject. The two became friends, and in 1655 Barrow dedicated his Euclid's Elements to Willughby and two other wealthy fellow pupils.

Although affluent students often left university without a degree, Willughby graduated BA in January 1656, and this was later promoted to MA by seniority in July 1660. In 1657 he joined Gray's Inn, not an unusual step for a man of property who might have to deal with legal disputes. Willughby and Ray had collaborated at Trinity on several "chymistry" projects, (Note: Chymistry was a mix of what would now be distinguished as chemistry and alchemy.) including making "sugar of lead" and extracting antimony, and in 1663 Willughby, then aged 27, was elected a founder Fellow of the Royal Society on the nominations of Ray and John Wilkins, who became Master of Trinity College in 1660, and eventually Bishop of Chester. In 1667 Ray was also elected as a Fellow of the Royal Society, but was excused the subscription because of his relative poverty.

== Travels ==
In the late sixteenth and early seventeenth centuries, Francis Bacon had advocated the advancement of knowledge through observation and experiment, rather than relying on the authority of Aristotle and the church. (Note: Willughby owned a copy of Bacon's Naturali et Universali Philosophia.) The Royal Society and its members such as Ray, Wilkins and Willughby sought to put the empirical method into practice, including travelling to collect specimens and information. (Note: Willughby's commonplace book, compiled while he was at Trinity, had a section on "the Art of Travel".) Willughby helped Ray in collecting plants for his botanical work Catalogus Plantarum circa Cantabrigiam Nascentium (the Cambridge Catalogue), which was published anonymously in February 1660.

Later that year, Ray and Willughby journeyed through northern England to the Lake District, the Isle of Man and the Calf of Man, seeing a Manx shearwater chick at the last site. Willughby then briefly visited the University of Oxford to consult some rare natural history books. (Note: The original journals for this expedition are lost, and the itinerary was reconstructed from scattered references by Ray's biographer, Charles Raven.)

=== Cheshire and Wales ===
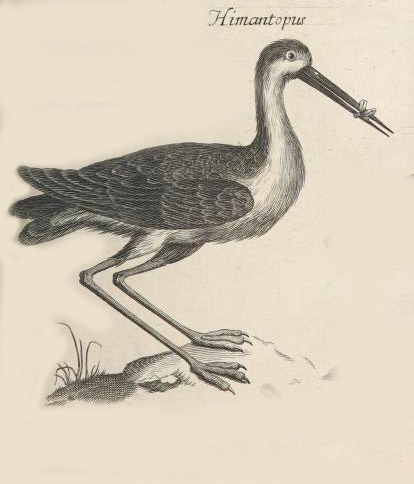
In South Wales, Willughby and Ray saw a rare black-winged stilt shown here in the Ornithologiae Libri Tres as "Himantopus".

In May 1662, Willughby, Ray and Philip Skippon, Ray's student, set out on a second journey through Nantwich and Chester and west to Anglesey. They returned inland to Llanberis and were shown a local lake fish called a torgoch, which Willughby recognised as essentially the same as the Windermere charr he had described previously in the Lake District. The party then headed south through west Wales to Pembroke, visiting Bardsey Island on the way. They then proceeded back along the Welsh south coast to Tenby, where they saw many fish species, and Aberavon, where they were shown a rare black-winged stilt.

Willughby interviewed Welsh speakers to attempt a systematic study of the language that, although never published, influenced subsequent scholars. It was during this trip that Ray and Willughby decided to attempt to classify all living things, with Ray mainly working on plants and Willughby on animals. The tables of species they produced were used by Wilkins as part of a unifying scheme later published in 1668 as An Essay towards a Real Character, and a Philosophical Language. Wilkins' intention was to create a universal terminology to describe the natural world, and the study of languages and writing systems was meant to create a logical linguistic framework for his classification.

Willughby and his companions parted company when he fell ill at Gloucester while they continued through the West Country to Land's End. When Willughby had recovered, he spent part of the summer birdwatching in Lincolnshire. Ray and Willughby later visited the West Country together in 1667, returning via Dorset, Hampshire and London.

=== Europe ===
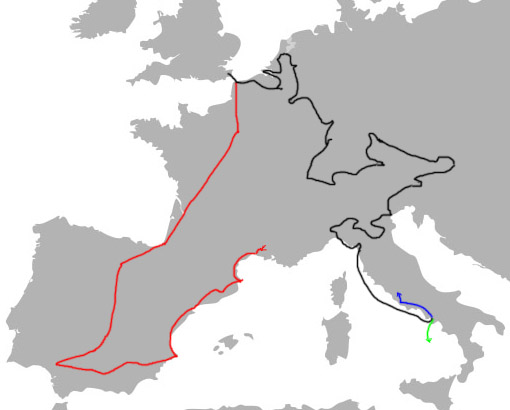
Approximate reconstruction of the journeys through Europe Willughby, Ray, Bacon and Skippon Ray and Skippon to Sicily and Malta Willughby and Bacon head north Willughby alone

In August 1662 Ray resigned his Fellowship at Cambridge, being unwilling to subscribe to the requirements of the Act of Uniformity imposed on Church of England clerics. Unemployed and without a source of income, his position might have been difficult, but Willughby offered him accommodation and work at Middleton, writing "I am likely to spend much of my life afterwards in wandring or else in Private Studiing at Oxford. having but little heart to thinke of settling, or ingaging in a family. I shall bee Verie glad of your constant company and assistance in my studies".

In April 1663, Willughby, Ray, Skippon and Nathaniel Bacon (another friend from Trinity) departed for continental Europe on a pre-planned itinerary armed with the requisite passports and letters of introduction to notable personages, with Willughby's wealth making the trip financially viable. They intended to visit museums, libraries and private collections, and also study local animals and plants. Given the limitations of time on their demanding schedule, fish and bird markets were a useful source of information and specimens. Although all kept journals, most of Willughby's are lost, and the journey is mainly documented in Ray's Observations topographical, moral & physiological made in a journey through part of the Low-Countries, Germany, Italy and France, which included Willughby's notes from Spain.

The travellers visited Brussels, the University of Leuven, Antwerp, Delft, The Hague and Leiden's university and public library. On 5 June (Note: Catholic Europe switched to the Gregorian calendar from 1582, but Great Britain did not adopt the new form until 1752. Dates for the journey are therefore based on the Julian calendar used by the travellers, and for the period concerned are ten days earlier than the Gregorian equivalent.) they visited a colony of cormorants, grey herons and spoonbills at Zevenhuizen, and Willughby dissected a spoonbill chick obtained there. The party continued north through Haarlem, Amsterdam and Utrecht before heading to Strasbourg, where Willughby made a diversion to buy a handwritten book from its author, Leonard Baldner. This book was illustrated with paintings of birds, fish and other animals. (Note: The paintings in Willughby's copies were by a Johann Georg Walther, and depicted 56 birds, 40 fish and 52 other animals including invertebrates.)

Baldner was a prosperous former fisherman, town councillor and self-taught naturalist who, like the Englishmen, only wrote about what he saw. Frederick Slare FRS made a translation of the German text into English, later added to Willughby's copy after his death. Ray claimed in his preface to the Ornithology: "For my part, I must needs acknowledge that I have received much light and information from the Work of this poor man, and have been thereby inabled to clear many difficulties, and rectifie some mistakes in Gesner.", although in practice few of Baldner's insights were incorporated into the text.

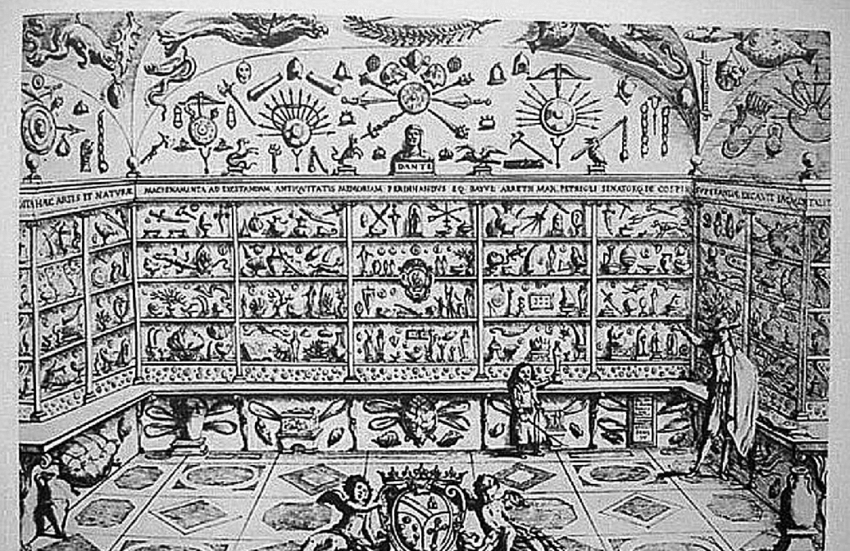
A room in the Palazzo Publico, Bologna, visited by Willughby's group to see the collections of Ferdinando Cospi and Ulisse Aldrovandi.

The party continued through Liège, Cologne and Nuremberg, and arrived in Vienna on 15 September where they stayed for several days before leaving on 24 September for Venice. (Note: The journey from Calais to Venice took 172 days in total, with 84 overnight stops.) The journey through the Alps was arduous, with poor mountain tracks, bad weather and little food except bread, and it was 6 October before they reached their destination, where Skippon listed 60 species of fish and 28 kinds of birds he had noted in the Venetian markets.

The group remained in Venice from 6 October 1663 to 1 February 1664, apart from a trip to Padua, where they investigated medical procedures including the dissection of human corpses. They then travelled through northern Italy, stopping in Ferrara, Verona, Bologna, Milan and Genoa. In Bologna they toured the public museum of the 'Bologna Aristotle', Ulisse Aldrovandi, "by the favor of Dr. Ovidio Montalbani," its current curator. On 15 April 1664 they set sail for Naples from Livorno. It was here that the party divided, Willughby and Bacon heading to Rome, where they spent May, June and July, while Ray and Skippon went on to Sicily and Malta.

Throughout the continental journey, Willughby and Skippon in particular had continued their research into languages. In Vienna, apart from visiting the local collections, they had taken the opportunity to study Turkish and several Slavic languages, and surviving manuscripts show comparison tables for seventeen languages including Basque, Armenian and Persian.

Bacon contracted smallpox somewhere in Northern Italy, and Willughby continued with just a servant to Montpellier, where Ray was already present. Willughby entered Spain on 31 August and progressed through Valencia, Granada, Seville, Cordoba and Madrid, reaching Irun on 14 November. (Note: The journey through Spain took 76 days in total, with 53 overnight stops.) Willughby found little of scientific interest in Spain, which he considered backward. He also disliked the land and the people: "almost desolate... tyrannical inquisition... multitude of whores... wretched laziness... very like the Welsh and Irish."

== Later life and death ==
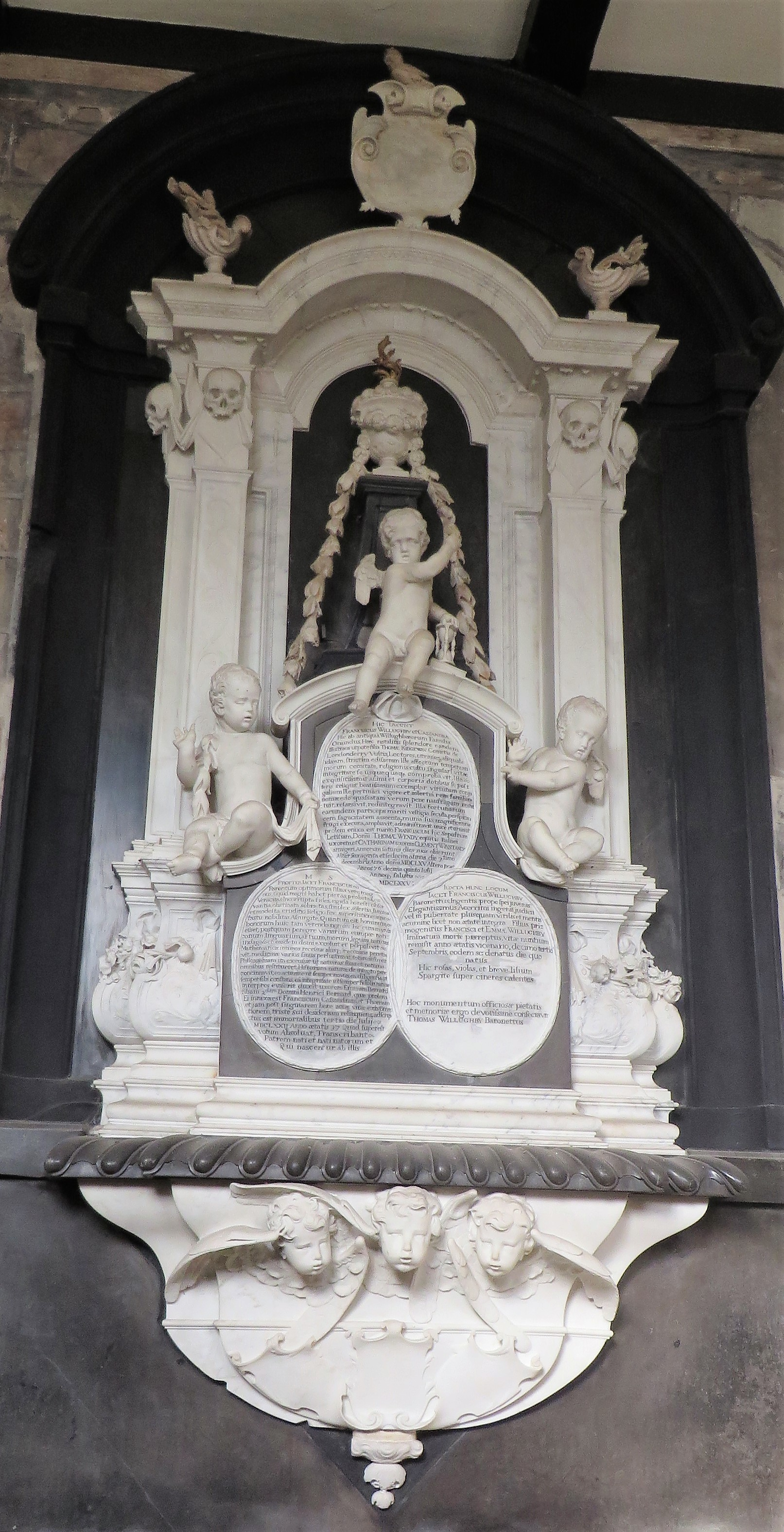
Willoughby memorial in Middleton church

In Seville, Willughby had received a letter saying that his father was seriously ill, so he had hastened his return to Middleton where he arrived shortly before Christmas 1664. His father died in December 1665 and Francis then became responsible for the estate. Willughby was soon being urged by his relatives to find a wife, but procrastinated knowing that this would restrict his researches.

In 1661 he had sent the Royal Society the first paper to describe the life cycle of insects, and he and Ray also verified the parasitoidism of caterpillars by ichneumon wasps. (Note: Charles Darwin was later to quote this as one reason why he doubted that there was a beneficent and omnipotent god.) Willughby also bred and studied leaf-cutter bees, his chosen research species later being named after him as Willughby's leaf-cutter bee, Megachile willughbiella. Willughby was the first person to unambiguously distinguish the honey buzzard from the common buzzard, and in 2018 it was suggested that the former species should be renamed "Willughby's Buzzard" to commemorate this.

In 1668 Willughby married Emma Barnard, daughter of Sir Henry Barnard of Bridgnorth and London. They had three children. Their first child, Francis, died at the age of nineteen, while their daughter Cassandra Willoughby married the Duke of Chandos, who was a patron of the English naturalist Mark Catesby. The second son, Thomas, was created Baron Middleton in 1711 by Queen Anne.

Willughby and Ray continued their researches, now mainly on birds, with the help of Francis Jessop, another Trinity alumnus, who sent them specimens from the Peak District, including twite and red grouse. They also were the first to investigate the active flow of sap in birches.

Willughby had suffered several periods of illness, including violent fevers, between 1668 and 1671, described by Ray as "tertian ague" (malaria), and the additional physical and financial demands occasioned by having to defend a bitterly disputed inheritance put him under more strain. (Note: A distant relative, William Willoughby, had left Francis the greater part of his estate. William Willoughby's sister and her husband, Beaumont Dixie, had expected to inherit more than they actually received, and argued that the deceased was not of sound mind when he made his will.) On 3 June 1672 he became seriously ill again, and signed his will on 24 June, disbarring any Catholic descendants from inheriting. He died on 3 July. The immediate cause of death was pleurisy, probably related to pneumonia. He was buried at St John the Baptist's Church, Middleton, with Ray, Skippon and Jessop present with the family at the interment. The church contains a large memorial commemorating Francis, his parents, Francis senior and Cassandra, and his son, also Francis; this was erected by his second son, Thomas.

== Subjects of his studies ==
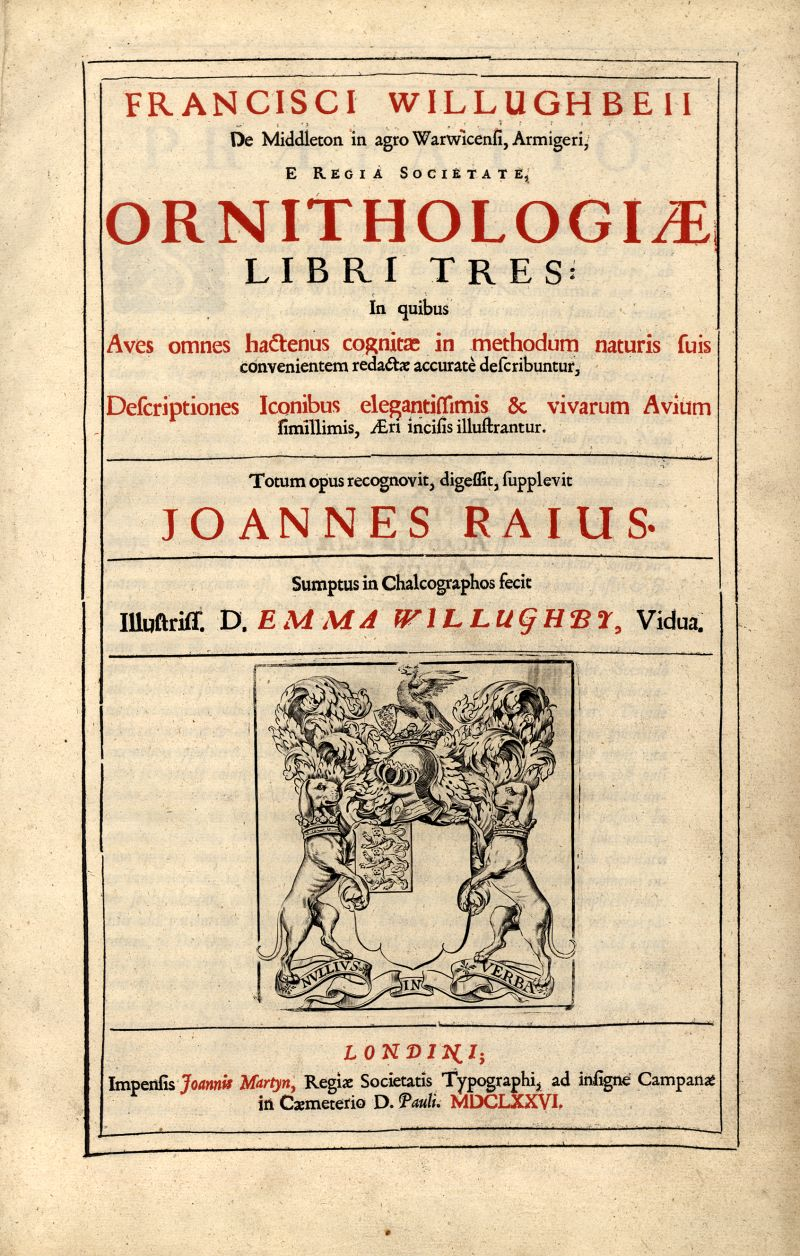
Title page of Ornithologiae Libri Tres

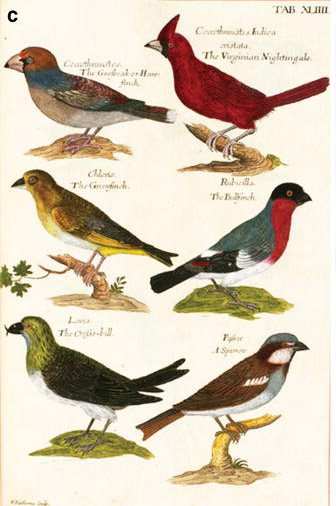
Plate XLIII from Samuel Pepys's hand-coloured copy of the Ornithology

As well as being a friend, John Ray was one of five executors of Willughby's will, in which he was left the sum of £60 a year for life. He saw it as his duty to complete and publish his colleague's work on animals.

=== Birds ===
Willughby's Ornithology was intended to describe all the then-known birds worldwide. Its innovative features were an effective classification system based on anatomical features, such the bird's beak, feet and overall size, and a dichotomous key, which helped readers to identify birds by guiding them to the page describing that group. The authors also placed an asterisk against species of which they had no first-hand knowledge, and were therefore unable to verify. Willughby had been keen to add details of "characteristic marks" to help with identification. The authors also largely avoided the practice of previous writers, such as Conrad Gessner, by not including extraneous material relating to the species, such as proverbs, references in history and literature, or use as an emblem. The book was published in Latin as Ornithologiae Libri Tres (Three Books of Ornithology) in 1676.

The first of the three sections included an introduction to bird biology, an explanation of the new classification system and the dichotomous key. The second and third sections described land birds and seabirds respectively. Emma Willughby paid for the 80 metal-engraved plates that completed the work, and this is acknowledged on the title page. The English-language version, The Ornithology of Francis Willughby of Middleton, published in 1678, included additional material, including a section on fowling to broaden its appeal, but had no mention of Willughby's widow. Its commercial success is unknown, but its influence was profound.

=== Fish ===
The next book, on fish, was many years in the making; Willughby's widow had remarried, and her new husband, Josiah Child, had barred Ray from accessing his friend's papers. Furthermore, there were far more known species of fish than there were birds to describe, and Ray was working on his own History of Plants. The Historia Piscium was finally published in Latin in 1686 with a dedication to Samuel Pepys, President of the Royal Society, who had made a generous financial contribution to the project. The book had four sections: an introduction to fish biology; cetaceans; cartilaginous fish (sharks and rays); and bony fish, the last group being further classified by the number and nature of their fins. 187 plates completed the work, their cost making the book a financial disaster for the Royal Society, which had largely funded its publication.

=== "Insects" ===
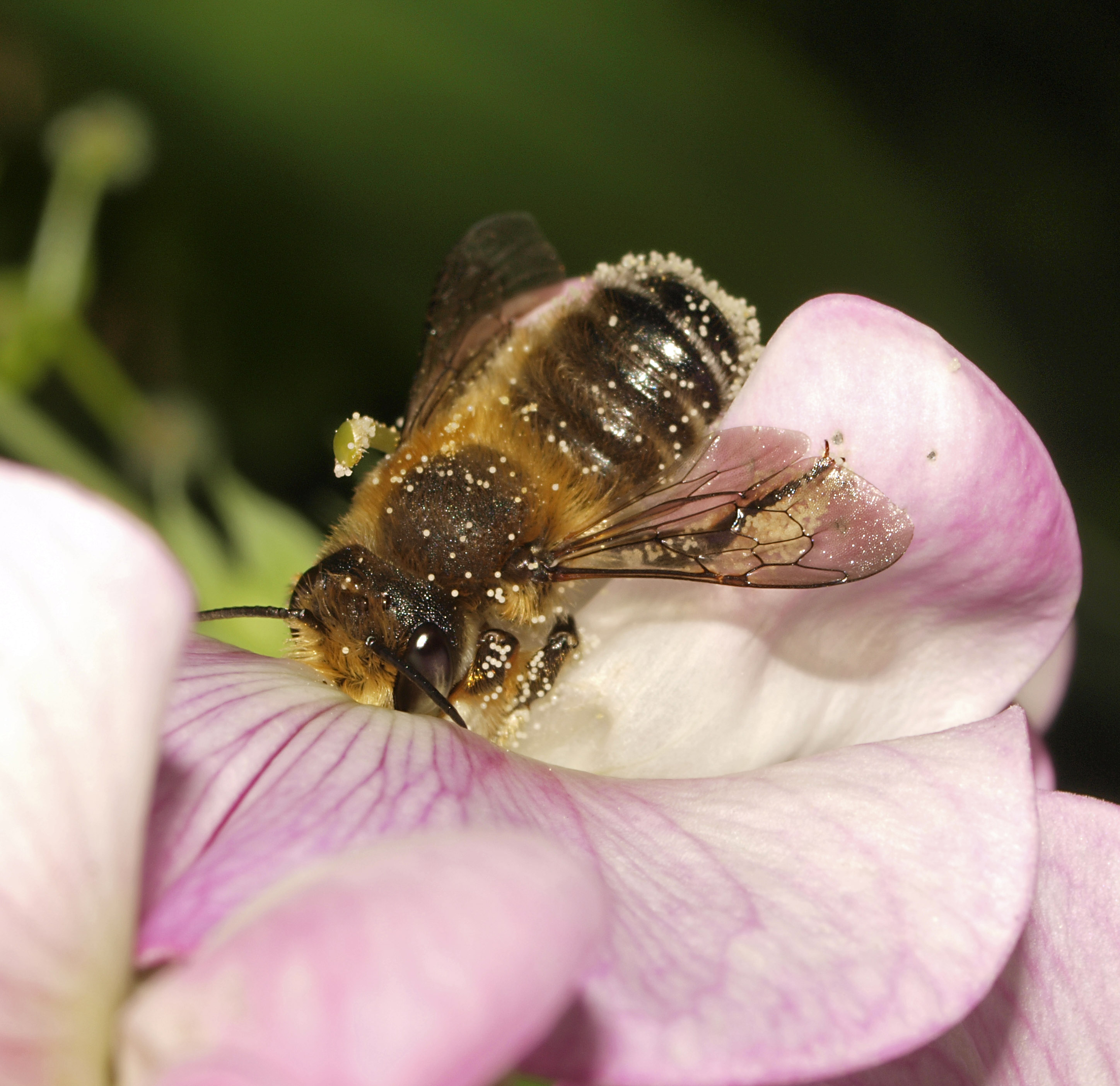
Willughby studied this leaf-cutter bee, named by Kirby in 1802 as Megachile willughbiella.

In the seventeenth century, the term "insect" had a much wider meaning than it does today, so the third major book, Historia Insectorum, included many other invertebrates, such as worms, spiders and millipedes. It excluded molluscs, perhaps because Martin Lister, another Fellow of the Royal Society, was writing his own Historia Animalium that covered that group. Ray's problems with completing this publication were much the same as with the fish book, although in 1704 he was able to see manuscripts prepared independently by Sir Thomas Willoughby and the scholar Thomas Man, Sir Thomas having moved into Wollaton Hall in 1687 and regained access to Middleton and his father's papers and possessions.

Ray died in January 1705, and little happened with the Historia Insectorum until William Derham and the Royal Society finally published it in 1710 in Latin, incomplete, unillustrated and under Ray's name only. Ray, however, makes it clear that Willughby did the bulk of the insect research, including, for example, 20 pages of beetle descriptions. The book had four sections, starting with an innovative classification system based on metamorphosis. The second section contained the main species descriptions, followed by Ray's observations of butterflies and moths and their caterpillars, and an appendix by Martin Lister on British beetles. Plates prepared by Sir Thomas Willoughby were not used, and they have now been lost, as have the manuscripts Sir Thomas showed to Ray.

=== Games and probability ===
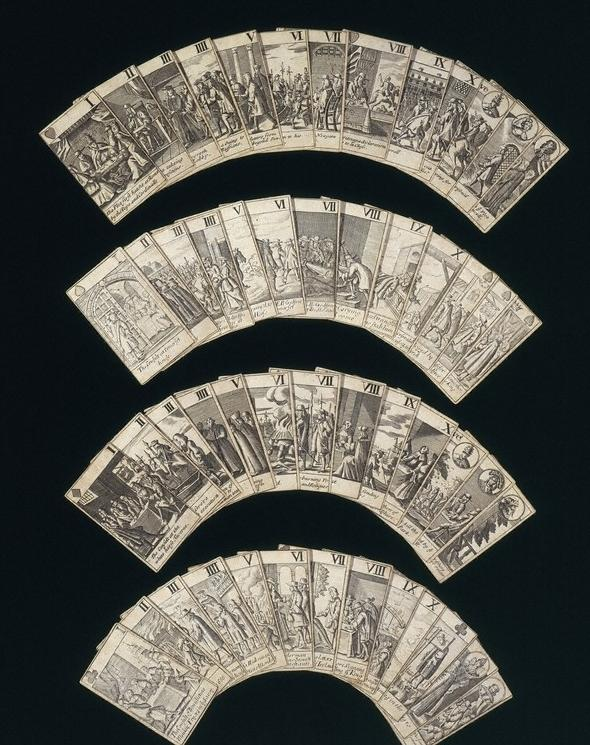
Willughby is believed to have studied probability with respect to card games. This 17th-century Popish Plot deck was engraved by Francis Barlow, whose bird paintings were the basis of some of the illustrations in the Ornithology.

Willughby's Book of Games was unfinished at his death, (Note: Book of Games was the name coined for the manuscript by Mary Welch, a former archivist of the University of Nottingham Library and the first to study the Middleton collection.) but was published with accompanying interpretative material in 2003. He gave details of dozens of games and sports, including cards, cockfighting, football and word games; some are now unfamiliar, such as "Lend me your Skimmer". For each entry he included the rules, equipment and manner of play. He also studied the first games that babies and children play, and wrote a more mathematical section "On the rebounding of tennis balls". As with his biological works, the Book of Games is organised on the empirical principles of observation, description, and classification.

A lost work appears to have been one that, according to his daughter Cassandra, "shews the chances of most games", which may have been titled The Book of Dice ("Historii Chartitudii"). Willughby was a competent mathematician, and there is evidence that the lost text considered probability with regard to card and dice games.

=== Illustrations and sources ===
The numerous plates illustrating the species in the bird and fish books came from a number of sources. Willughby's own extensive collection included paintings he had bought on his European travels, and he also borrowed pictures owned by friends like Skippon and Sir Thomas Browne. Many illustrations were taken from previous publications by other writers, and some were based on Francis Barlow's oil-paintings of birds in Charles II's aviary in St James's Park.

The illustrations taken from earlier books were from many sources, particularly the earlier natural histories or ornithologies by Ulisse Aldrovandi, Pietro Olina, Georg Marcgrave and Willem Piso. Where feasible, Willughby and Ray compared the available illustrations with life or specimens, or, if that were not possible, against each other, to select the most accurate version for publication. In addition to these authors, sources used for the text included works by Carolus Clusius, Adriaen Collaert, Gervase Markham, Juan Eusebio Nieremberg and Ole Worm. Olina's Ucelliera, at least, seems to have been revisited between the Latin and English editions of the Ornithology, since the later version contains a description of territorial behaviour by the nightingale absent from the earlier work.

== Legacy ==
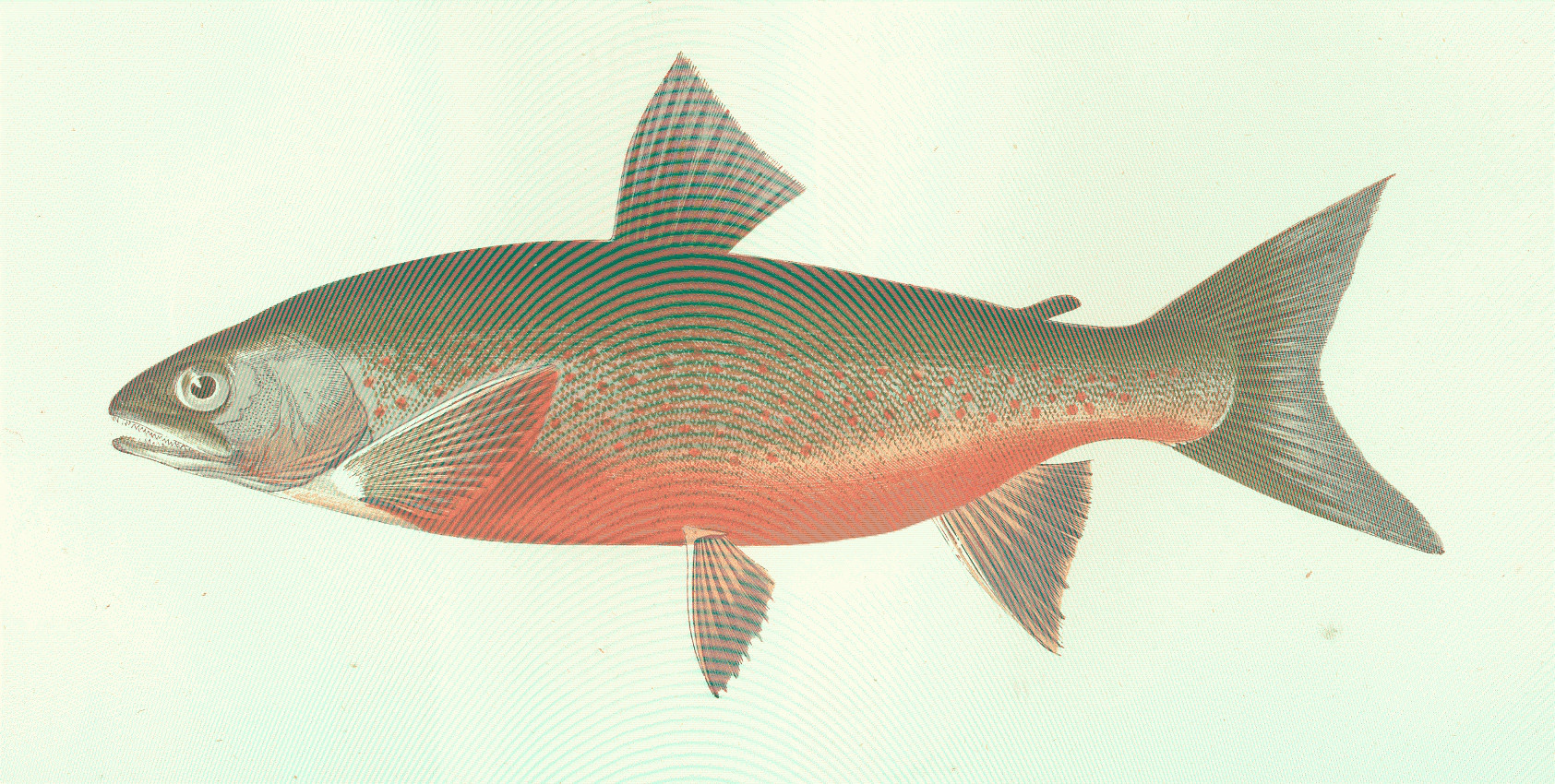
Windermere or Willughby's charr, Salvelinus willughbii

Much of Willughby's written work has been lost, along with his scientific equipment and most of his collections of items of natural history interest; what remains is largely owned by the family and housed in the University of Nottingham Middleton archive. The Ornithology influenced Réamur in organising his great bird collection, and Brisson in the compilation of his own work on the topic. Georges Cuvier commented on the influence of the Historia Piscium, and Carl Linnaeus from 1735 onwards relied heavily on Willughby and Ray's books in his Systema Naturae, the basis of binomial nomenclature.

The lack of physical evidence, together with Willughby's early death and the publication of his books by Ray, means that the relative contributions of the two men has subsequently been disputed. Willughby's work was initially well-regarded, but Ray's reputation grew as time passed, and, in 1788, the English botanist James Edward Smith wrote that Willughby's contribution had been overstated by his friend, who gave himself too little credit. The opposite view was given by William Swainson, who felt that Ray's fame rested entirely on that of his patron, and he lacked the genius to have achieved anything on his own.

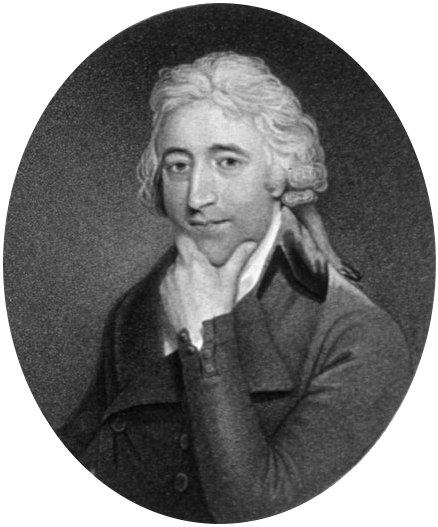
James Edward Smith wrote in 1788 that Willughby's contribution was overstated.

The pendulum swung again when Charles E. Raven wrote his 1942 biography of Ray, seeing him as the senior partner and saying that Willughby had "less knowledge, patience and judgment" than Ray, whom he considered a scientist of genius, and whose contributions he tended to compare favourably with the achievements of most other writers. Raven was unaware of the Willughby family archive at the University of Nottingham when he wrote his book, and access to that and other new material have led to modern appraisals giving a more balanced picture, with the two men seen to have made significant individual contributions, each demonstrating his own strengths.

Willughby and Ray discovered several previously undescribed species of birds, fish and invertebrates. The names of the Windermere charr (Salvelinus willughbii), Willughby's leaf-cutter bee (Megachile willughbiella) and the tropical plant genus Willughbeia all commemorate the younger man. However, Willughby and Ray's main influence was through their three books, especially the Ornithology, with their emphasis on systematic description and classification. Even Willughby's own collection of 170 plates and nature paintings seems to be intended not just to provide individual illustrations, but to be an integral part of a collection intended to reinforce the order of nature.

== Books ==
- Ray, John (1673). Observations Topographical, Moral, & Physiological; Made in a Journey Through Part of the Low-countries, Germany, Italy, and France. London: John Martyn.
- Ray, John (1710). Historia Insectorum (in Latin). London: A&J Churchill.
- Wilkins, John (1668). An Essay towards a Real Character and a Philosophical Language. London: John Martyn.
- Willughby, Francis; Ray, John (1676). Ornithologiae Libri Tres (in Latin). London: John Martyn.
- Willughby, Francis; Ray, John (1678). The Ornithology of Francis Willughby of Middleton in the County of Warwick. London: John Martyn.
- Willughby, Francis; Ray, John (1686). Historia Piscium (in Latin). Oxford: E Theatro Sheldoniano.

== Notes ==
- Birkhead, Tim (2011). The Wisdom of Birds: An Illustrated History of Ornithology. London: Bloomsbury. ISBN 978-0-7475-9822-0.
- Birkhead, Tim (2018). The Wonderful Mr Willughby: The First True Ornithologist. London: Bloomsbury. ISBN 978-1-4088-7848-4.
- Birkhead, Tim; Smith, Paul J.; Doherty, Meghan; Charmantier, Isabelle (2016). "Willughby's Ornithology". In Birkhead, Tim (ed.). Virtuoso by Nature: The Scientific Worlds of Francis Willughby FRS (1635–1672). Leiden: Brill. pp. 268–304. ISBN 978-90-04-28531-6.
- Chandos, Brydges Cassandra Willoughby, Duchess of (1958). Wood, A C (ed.). The Continuation of the History of the Willoughby Family. Windsor, UK: University of Nottingham. OCLC 65482756.
- Charmantier, Isabelle; Johnston, Dorothy; Smith, Paul J (2016). "The legacies of Francis Willughby". In Birkhead, Tim (ed.). Virtuoso by Nature: The Scientific Worlds of Francis Willughby FRS (1635–1672). Leiden: Brill. pp. 360–385. ISBN 978-90-04-28531-6.
- Cram, David (1990). "John Ray and Francis Willughby: Universal language schemes and the foundations of linguistic field research". In Hüllen, Werner (ed.). Understanding the Historiography of Linguistics. Münster: Nodus. pp. 229–239. ISBN 978-3-89323-221-5.
- Cram, David (1992). "Language universals and seventeenth-century universal schemes". In Subbiondo, Joseph L (ed.). John Wilkins and 17th-Century British Linguistics. Amsterdam: John Benjamins. pp. 191–206. ISBN 978-1-55619-362-0.
- Cram, David; Foreng, Jeffrey L; Johnston, Dorothy (2003). Francis Willughby's Book of Games: A Seventeenth-Century Treatise on Sports, Games and Pastimes. Aldershot: Routledge. ISBN 978-1-85928-460-5.
- Cram, David (2016). "Francis Willughby and John Ray on words and things". In Birkhead, Tim (ed.). Virtuoso by Nature: The Scientific Worlds of Francis Willughby FRS (1635–1672). Leiden: Brill. pp. 244–267. ISBN 978-90-04-28531-6.
- Greengrass, Mark; Hildyard, Daisy; Preston, Christopher D; Smith, Paul J (2016). "Science on the move: Francis Willughby's expeditions". In Birkhead, Tim (ed.). Virtuoso by Nature: The Scientific Worlds of Francis Willughby FRS (1635–1672). Leiden: Brill. pp. 142–226. ISBN 978-90-04-28531-6.
- Gurney, John Henry (1921). Early Annals of Ornithology. London: H. F. & G. Witherby.
- Jackson, Christine E (2006). Peacock. London: Reaktion. ISBN 978-1-86189-293-5.
- Jardine, Lisa (1999). Ingenious Pursuits: Building the Scientific Revolution. London: Little, Brown. ISBN 978-0-349-11305-0.
- Johanson, Zerina; Barrett, Paul M; Richter, Martha; Smith, Mike (2016). Arthur Smith Woodward: His Life and Influence on Modern Vertebrate Palaeontology. Geological Society of London, Special Publications. Vol. 430. London: Geological Society of London. ISBN 978-1-86239-741-5.
- Johnston, Dorothy (2016). "The life and domestic context of Francis Willughby". In Birkhead, Tim (ed.). Virtuoso by Nature: The Scientific Worlds of Francis Willughby FRS (1635–1672). Leiden: Brill. pp. 1–43. ISBN 978-90-04-28531-6.
- Kusukawa, Sachiko (2016). "Historia Piscium (1686) and its sources". In Birkhead, Tim (ed.). Virtuoso by Nature: The Scientific Worlds of Francis Willughby FRS (1635–1672). Leiden: Brill. pp. 305–334. ISBN 978-90-04-28531-6.
- Ogilvie, Brian W (2016). "Willughby on insects". In Birkhead, Tim (ed.). Virtuoso by Nature: The Scientific Worlds of Francis Willughby FRS (1635–1672). Leiden: Brill. pp. 1–43. ISBN 978-90-04-28531-6.
- Poole, William (2016). "The Willughby library in the time of Francis the naturalist". In Birkhead, Tim (ed.). Virtuoso by Nature: The Scientific Worlds of Francis Willughby FRS (1635–1672). Leiden: Brill. pp. 227–243. ISBN 978-90-04-28531-6.
- Raven, Charles E. (1942). John Ray, Naturalist: His Life and Works. Cambridge: Cambridge University Press. ISBN 978-0-521-31083-3.
- Roos, Anna Marie (2016). "The chymistry of Francis Willughby (1635–72): the Trinity College, Cambridge community". In Birkhead, Tim (ed.). Virtuoso by Nature: The Scientific Worlds of Francis Willughby FRS (1635–1672). Leiden: Brill. pp. 99–121. ISBN 978-90-04-28531-6.
- Serjeantson, Richard (2016). "The education of Francis Willughby". In Birkhead, Tim (ed.). Virtuoso by Nature: The Scientific Worlds of Francis Willughby FRS (1635–1672). Leiden: Brill. pp. 44–98. ISBN 978-90-04-28531-6.
- Wardhaugh, Benjamin (2016). "Willughby's mathematics". In Birkhead, Tim (ed.). Virtuoso by Nature: The Scientific Worlds of Francis Willughby FRS (1635–1672). Leiden: Brill. pp. 122–141. ISBN 978-90-04-28531-6.

== Bibliography ==
- Willughby, Francis. A Volume of Plaies. (Manuscript in the Middleton collection, University of Nottingham, shelfmark Li 113.) c1665-70.
