= De Historia piscium =

1686 book by Francis Willughby and John Ray

De Historia Piscium (Latin for 'Of the History of Fish') is a scientific book written by Francis Willughby and John Ray and published by the Royal Society in 1686. The book was the first illustrated work on ichthyology to be published in England.

== Creation ==
Francis Willughby began work on De Historia Piscium in 1663. Willughby and Ray travelled together on a tour of Europe to study the natural world prior to the beginning of the production of the book. The book was completed by John Ray after Willughby's death in 1672. Ray's motivations have been linked to the wider aims of the Royal Society, namely to recover knowledge lost after the Fall of the Western Roman Empire.

== Content ==
Willughby, and later Ray, produced a system within De Historia Piscium which would allow for the definition, classification, and identification of fish using external features.

One of the main features of the book was its extensive illustrations, financed by subscriptions to the Society, but still a huge cost. The cost of the illustrations was the principal cause of the excessive expense of the publication of the book, which ultimately put serious strain on the Society's finances.

== Failure and unpopularity ==
It was unpopular and sold poorly, causing severe strain on the finances of the society. This resulted in the society being unable to meet its promise to finance the publication of Newton's Philosophiae Naturalis Principia Mathematica ("Mathematical Principles of Natural Philosophy", better known simply as Principia), leaving this to Edmond Halley, who was then the clerk of the society.

After Halley had personally financed the publication of Principia, he was informed that the society could no longer afford to provide him the promised annual salary of £50. Instead, Halley was paid with left-over copies of De Historia Piscium.
