= Michael Willoughby =

Michael Willoughby may refer to:

- Michael Willoughby, 11th Baron Middleton (1887–1970), British peer and soldier
- Michael Willoughby, 12th Baron Middleton (1921–2011), British peer and soldier
