= Henry Willoughby, 8th Baron Middleton =

English peer (1817–1877)

Henry Willoughby, 8th Baron Middleton (28 August 1817 – 20 December 1877), was an English peer.

== Early life ==
Willoughby was born at Apsley Hall, Nottingham, on 28 August 1817. He was the eldest son of Henry Willoughby (1780–1849) and Charlotte Eyre (d. 1845). Among his siblings were Charlotte Henrietta Willoughby (wife of Henry Willoughby Legard, son of Sir Thomas Legard, 7th Baronet); Francis Digby Willoughby (a Captain in the 9th Lancers); the Rev. Hon. Charles James Willoughby (who married Charlotte Payne Seymour); Emma Willoughby (who the Rev. Richard Machell); Hon. Harriet Cassandra Willoughby (who married Henry's brother-in-law, Godfrey Wentworth Bayard Bosville, de jure 13th Baronet); and the Rev. Hon. Percival George Willoughby (who married Sophia Beaumont, sister of Frederick Beaumont).

His paternal grandparents were the Rev. Hon. James Willoughby (a grandson of the 1st Baron Middleton) and Eleanor Hobson (a daughter of James Hobson of Kirkbymoorside). His maternal grandparents were the Ven. John Eyre, Archdeacon of Nottingham, and the former Charlotte Armytage (a daughter of Sir George Armytage, 3rd Baronet).

He was educated at Eton and Trinity College, Cambridge, which he entered in 1836.

== Career ==
He succeeded to the title of Baron Middleton in 1856, on the passing of his cousin, the 7th Baron Middleton, who died without legitimate issue. He lived in the Willoughby family seat at Birdsall House, which he preferred to Wollaton Park, Nottinghamshire, the family seat he inherited from his cousin.

He was appointed Honorary Colonel of the 1st Administrative Brigade of Yorkshire (East Riding) Artillery Volunteers on 17 December 1862, and his son the Hon. Digby Willoughby, (later 9th Baron), a former captain in the Scots Fusilier Guards, was appointed second major in the brigade on 30 July 1869. The 9th Baron later commanded the unit as Lt-Col, became Honorary Colonel in turn on 29 May 1879, and held the post into the 20th Century.

== Personal life ==
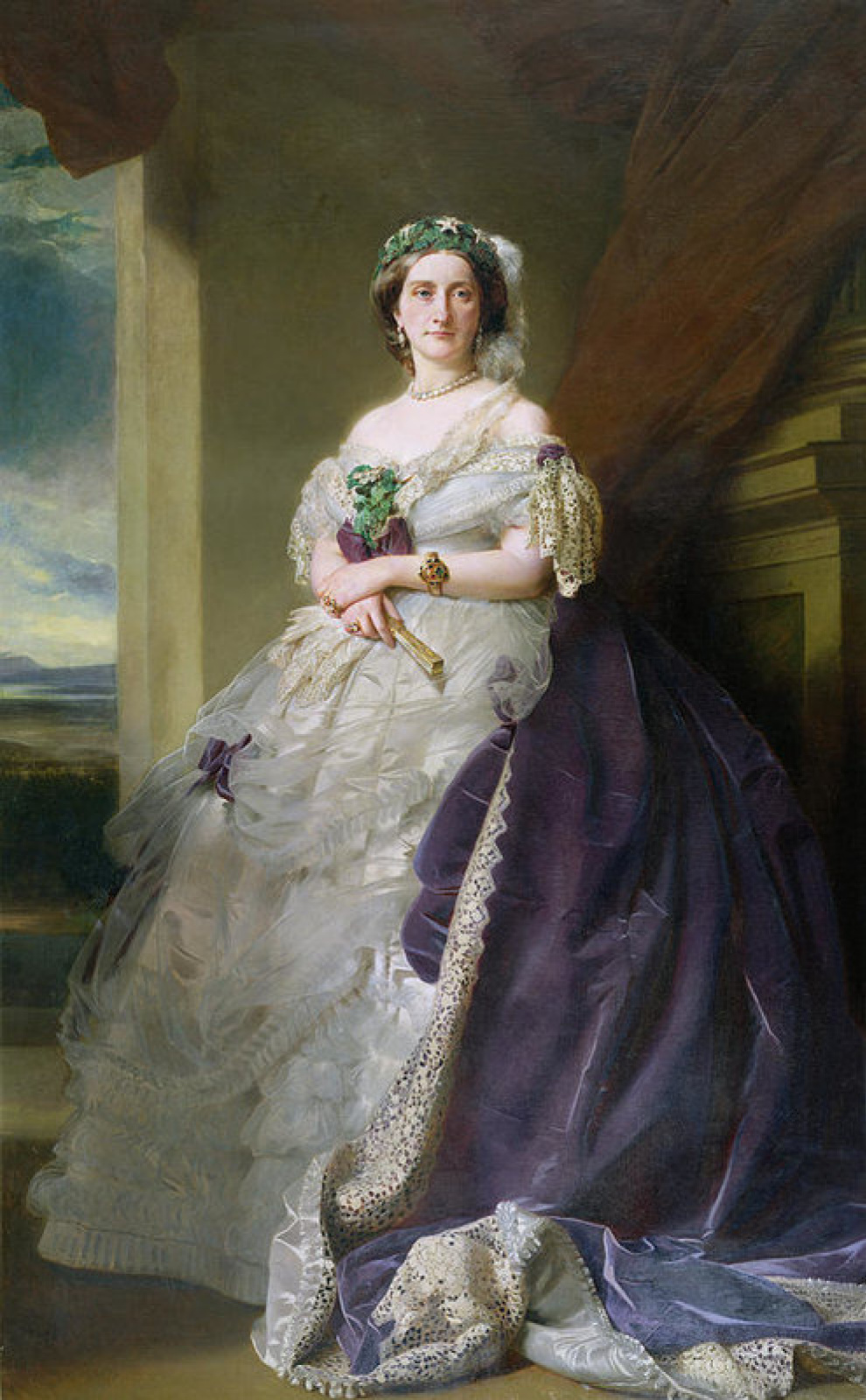
Portrait of his wife, Julia Louise Bosville, Lady Middleton, by Franz Xaver Winterhalter, 1863

On 3 August 1843, he married the Hon. Julia Louisa Bosville (1824–1901) in London. Julia was the daughter of Alexander William Robert Bosville (the eldest, but illegitimate, son of the 3rd Baron Macdonald and Louisa Maria La Coast, herself purported to be the illegitimate daughter of Prince William Henry, Duke of Gloucester and Edinburgh). Together, they had thirteen children, including:

- Digby Wentworth Bayard Willoughby, 9th Baron Middleton (1844–1922), who married Eliza Maria Gordon-Cumming, a daughter of Sir Alexander Gordon-Cumming, 3rd Baronet, in 1869.
- Hon. Alexandrina Henrietta Matilda Willoughby (1845–1931), who married Sir John Thorold 12th Thorold Baronet, in 1869.
- Godfrey Ernest Percival Willoughby, 10th Baron Middleton (1847–1924), who married Ida Eleonora Constance Ross, daughter of Lt.-Col. George William Holmes Ross, in 1881.
- Hon. Francis Henry Stirling Willoughby (1848–1900)
- Hon. Rothwell James Bosville Willoughby (1850–1867), who died young.
- Hon. Leopold Vincent Harold Willoughby (1851–1924)
- Hon. Hylda Maria Madeline Willoughby (c. 1853–1944), who married William Henry Garforth in 1882.
- Hon. Lettice Hermione Violet Willoughby (c. 1854–1922), who married Col. William Gordon-Cumming, a younger son of Sir William Gordon-Cumming, 2nd Baronet, in 1895.
- Hon. Leila Louisa Millicent Willoughby (c. 1856–1886), who married the Rev. Henry Charles Russell, son of Lord Charles Russell (third son of the 6th Duke of Bedford), in 1876.
- Hon. Mairi Myrtle Willoughby (c. 1858–1900), who married William Bethell, a son of William Froggatt Bethell, in 1880.
- Hon. Tatton Lane Fox Willoughby (1860–1947), who married Esther Ann Strickland, a daughter of Sir Charles Strickland, 8th Baronet, in 1898.
- Col. Hon. Claude Henry Comaraich Willoughby (1862–1932), who married Sibyl Louise Murray, a daughter of Charles James Murray (son of Charles Murray and grandson of the 5th Earl of Dunmore) and Lady Anne Finch (a daughter of the 6th Earl of Aylesford) in 1904.
- Hon. Alexander Hugh Willoughby (1863–1927), who married Mary Selina Honoria Macdonald, a daughter of Lt.-Gen. Hon. James Macdonald (a son of the 3rd Baron Macdonald of Slate) and Hon. Elizabeth Blake (a daughter of the 3rd Baron Wallscourt), in 1889.

Lord Middleton died on 20 December 1877 at Birdsall House, Birdsall, and was succeeded in the barony by his eldest son, Digby.

Peerage of Great Britain
Preceded by Digby Willoughby	Baron Middleton; 1856–1877	Succeeded by Digby Willoughby
