= Henry Goodere =

Henry Goodere may refer to:

- Sir Henry Goodere (politician) (1534–1595), English landowner and member of parliament
- Sir Henry Goodere (courtier) (c. 1571–1627), English landowner and courtier
