= Garforth (name) =

Garforth is a surname. Notable people with the surname include:

- Andrew Garforth (born 1963), Australian murderer
- Charles Ernest Garforth (1891–1973), Recipient of the Victoria Cross
- Darren Garforth (born 1966), English rugby player
- William Garforth (1855–1931), English cricketer and soldier
