= Listed buildings in Birdsall, North Yorkshire =

Birdsall is a civil parish in the county of North Yorkshire, England. It contains 22 listed buildings that are recorded in the National Heritage List for England. Of these, one is listed at Grade I, the highest of the three grades, one is at Grade II*, the middle grade, and the others are at Grade II, the lowest grade. The parish contains the villages of Birdsall and North Grimston and the surrounding countryside. The listed buildings include a country house and associated structures, houses and cottages, farmhouses and farm buildings, three churches, one of them ruined, and a group of kennels.

== Key ==
Grade	Criteria
I	Buildings of exceptional interest, sometimes considered to be internationally important
II*	Particularly important buildings of more than special interest
II	Buildings of national importance and special interest

== Buildings ==
Name and location	Photograph	Date	Notes	Grade
St Nicholas' Church, North Grimston; 54.09907°N 0.71481°W		12th century	The church has been altered and extended through the centuries. It consists of a nave with a south porch, a chancel and a west tower. The tower has clasping buttresses and string courses, and on the west side is a lancet window and a 13th-century sculpture of Saint Nicholas. The bell openings are paired with pointed heads, and the parapet is plain and coped. In the nave are opposing round-arched doorways. The north doorway is plain with a panel depicting beasts above, and the south doorway has two orders, with roll-moulding and nailheads. On the north side is a Norman corbel table carved with beasts' heads.	I
Ruined church, Birdsall; 54.07311°N 0.75497°W		12th century	The ruins of the church are in the grounds of Birdsall House. The oldest part is the Norman chancel arch, there is an arcade dating from the 14th century, and a west tower clasped by the arcade. On the north side is a Tudor arched doorway, the arcade consists of four pointed arches with two chamfered orders, and the chancel arch also has two orders.	II
Birdsall House; 54.07304°N 0.75577°W		Late 16th century	A country house that was remodelled in 1749, and further remodelled and extended in 1872 by Anthony Salvin. It is in stone with hipped Welsh slate roofs. The main block has three storeys and five bays, flanked by two-storey single-bay links to wings with two storeys and six bays, and there is a rear parallel service wing. In the centre is a hexastyle Tuscan portico in antis with a balustrade and a plain entablature, and a doorway in a rusticated architrave with a metope frieze and a pediment. The windows are sashes in architraves with keystones, and at the top is a moulded cornice and a balustrade.	II*
Kitchen garden wall, Birdsall House; 54.07408°N 0.75450°W	—	18th century	The south wall is in limestone, and is about 4 metres (13 ft) high and 40 metres (130 ft) long. The west wall is in brick with stone coping, and is about 4 metres (13 ft) high and 90 metres (300 ft) long.	II
Mount Ferrant House; 54.06481°N 0.77814°W		Mid 18th century	The house is in limestone with a timber outshut and a pantile roof. There are two storeys, three bays, and an outshut on the front containing a doorway. The windows are horizontally-sliding sashes.	II
Picksharp House; 54.07181°N 0.72178°W		c. 1760	The house is in brick on a limestone plinth, and has a French tile roof. There are three storeys and three bays, and a rear outshut. In the centre is a gabled porch. The windows are sashes with segmental heads and keystones, those in the outer bays are tripartite.	II
Langar Cottages; 54.07626°N 0.75235°W	—	Mid to late 18th century	A pair of cottages, the left one added later, in limestone with two storeys. The left cottage has two bays, sprocketed eaves and a pantile roof. It contains a central doorway with a fanlight and sash windows. The right cottage has five bays and a French tile roof. It contains two doorways, one with a fanlight, and a mix of windows, consisting of sashes, horizontally-sliding sashes and casements.	II
Brewery, Birdsall House; 54.07341°N 0.75491°W	—	Late 18th century	The former brewery is in limestone, and has a Westmorland slate roof with gable copings. It consists of a single cell with rounded corners and two storeys. In the ground floor is a doorway with a shouldered surround, and the upper floor contains a louvred opening.	II
Laundry, Birdsall House; 54.07334°N 0.75523°W	—	Late 18th century	The former laundry is in sandstone with a hipped Westmorland slate roof. There is a single storey and nine bays. In the centre is a blocked window flanked by doors with fanlights, and the other windows are sashes. All the openings have massive lintels with keystones.	II
Luddith Farmhouse; 54.08651°N 0.72736°W	—	Late 18th century	The farmhouse is in limestone, partly rendered, with a dentilled eaves course, sprocketed eaves, and a pantile roof with gable coping and shaped kneelers. There are two storeys, three bays, and a rear cross wing and outshut. On the front is a gabled porch, and the windows are sashes.	II
North Grimston House; 54.09971°N 0.71562°W		Late 18th century	A front range was added to the house in the early 19th century. It is in limestone with a hipped Westmorland slate roof. There are two storeys and three bays. On the front is a Tuscan porch, and the windows are sashes with louvred shutters.	II
Shed and granary, Picksharp Farm; 54.07192°N 0.72132°W		Late 18th century	The shed with a granary above is in limestone with a pantile roof. There are two storeys and five bays. In the ground floor are four segmental arches and an unglazed window to the right, and above are four pitching windows.	II
The Huntsman's House; 54.06913°N 0.75904°W	—	Late 18th century	The house is in limestone and has a Welsh slate roof with gable coping and shaped kneelers. There are two storeys, three bays, a rear cross wing, and a single-storey extension at the rear to the left. On the front is a porch, and sash windows with lintels and keystones. On the extension is a coped parapet and a finial.	II
The Yard; 54.09850°N 0.71257°W		Late 18th century	A limestone house with brick at the rear, sprocketed eaves, and a pantile roof. There are three storeys, three bays, and two parallel ranges. The central doorway has a fanlight, and the windows are sashes with lintels and keystones.	II
Estate office 54.07588°N 0.74996°W		c. 1820	A farmhouse, later an estate office, in limestone on a plinth, with a floor band, a moulded cornice, and hipped Welsh slate roofs. There are two storeys, a central block of three bays, and recessed side wings. In the centre is a round-arched doorway with a fanlight. The windows are sashes, those flanking the doorway are tripartite under relieving arches, and above they have flat heads. The wings each contains a window with a round head in the ground floor, and with a flat head above.	II
St Mary's Church, Birdsall; 54.07799°N 0.75068°W		1823–24	The chancel and the top stage of the tower were added in 1879–81 by C. Hodgson Fowler. The church is built in limestone, and consists of a nave with a north boiler house, a chancel with a north vestry, and a west tower. The tower has three stages, diagonal stepped buttresses, a semi-octagonal stair turret to the north, string courses, and an openwork parapet with octagonal corner turrets and finials. On the lowest stage is a window with a pointed head on the west side, and on the south side is a doorway with a pointed head, a hood mould with crockets, and a bas-relief with two figures and a coat of arms. In the middle stage are lancet windows, and above, the bell openings have three lights. Along the nave are pierced parapets.	II
Barn and shed, Aldro Farm; 54.05588°N 0.76630°W		Early 19th century	The barn and shed are in brick and limestone, and have sprocketed eaves, pantile roofs with gable copings and shaped kneelers, and two storeys. The barn has three bays, and the openings include stable doors and a pitching door. The shed, at right angles, has six bays, six elliptical arches in the ground floor, and pitching windows under canted arches above.	II
Stables, Birdsall House; 54.07376°N 0.75397°W		1828	The stable block is in stone with hipped Welsh slate roofs, and two or three storeys. It consists of a long range with four wings at the front and one at the rear, forming two larger yards and a smaller yard to the north, and there is a lean-to coach house. The carriage entrances have elliptical heads, and most of the windows, which are sashes, have round-arched heads. The doorways have fanlights, and there are hood moulds, some continuous over a number of openings.	II
Granary, Birdsall Grange; 54.07989°N 0.76075°W		c. 1840	This consists of an implement shed with a granary above. The building is in limestone with a floor band, cruciform vents, and a hipped Westmorland slate roof. There are two storeys, an T-shaped plan, and an east front of five bays, each bay containing an elliptical arch on the ground floor, infilled with brick and some with inserted doorways. The upper floor has a round-arched pitching door with a keystone, flanked by lower round-arched openings with keystones.	II
Middleton Hunt Kennels; 54.06901°N 0.76110°W	—	1858	The kennels are in rendered brick with Welsh slate] roofs, and the dog pens are in brick with iron railings. They consist of a central block with side wings, dog pens in front, and flanking staff houses. In the centre is a section with one bay and two storeys. This has rusticated quoins, and the ground floor is rendered. It contains an elliptical arch with a keystone, a floor band, a fixed window flanked by bas-reliefs of kings' heads, a clock, gable coping and a shaped kneeler. On the top is a rusticated bell turret with a moulded cornice and a wrought iron fox weathervane. This is flanked by three sections, each with a dog pen. The staff houses have two storeys and four bays, quoins, floor bands, and sash windows in architraves.	II
Home Farm Buildings; 54.07599°N 0.74929°W		1868	The farm buildings include foldyards, a dairy, a barn, offices and an implement shed. They are in limestone and have roofs of Welsh slate, pantile and French tile. On the north side is a long range with a barn on the left, offices in the middle and a shed on the right. Behind are six parallel ranges consisting of four covered foldyards and two sheds, and along the south front are six gables.	II
Poultry houses, Home Farm; 54.07640°N 0.74941°W	—	1868	The poultry houses are in limestone with Welsh slate roofs. They have a U-shaped plan, consisting of a main range with a single storey and six bays, flanked by two-bay cross wings, with square two-storey pavilions on the corners. Each pavilion contains a door and a window above, and has a pyramidal roof with a wooden turret, a cupola and a finial. In the main range are six stable doors and three fixed windows, and the left wing contains horizontally-sliding sash windows. The yard is divided into two and enclosed by coped walls with iron railings.	II
