= Digby Willoughby, 9th Baron Middleton =

English nobleman

Digby Wentworth Bayard Willoughby, 9th Baron Middleton (24 August 1844 – 28 May 1922), was an English nobleman, the eldest son of Henry Willoughby, 8th Baron Middleton.

He was educated at Eton. He served in the 1860s with the Scots Fusilier Guards, retiring with the rank of captain. On 30 July 1869 he was appointed second major in the 1st Administrative Brigade of Yorkshire (East Riding) Artillery Volunteers, of which his father the 8th Baron was honorary colonel. The 9th Baron later commanded the unit as lieutenant-colonel, became Hon Col in turn on 29 May 1879, and held the post into the 20th Century.

On 5 August 1869 married Eliza Maria Gordon-Cumming (16 June 1847 – 27 April 1922 Birdsall House, Birdsall). The couple had no children.

He succeeded his father in 1877 and lived in the Willoughby family seat at Birdsall House which he preferred to Wollaton Park, Nottingham, and died there. He was succeeded in the barony by his younger brother Godfrey Ernest Percival Willoughby.

Peerage of Great Britain
Preceded by Henry Willoughby	Baron Middleton; 1877–1922	Succeeded by Godfrey Willoughby
