= Digby Willoughby, 7th Baron Middleton =

English nobleman and sailor

Captain The Right Honourable The Lord Middleton
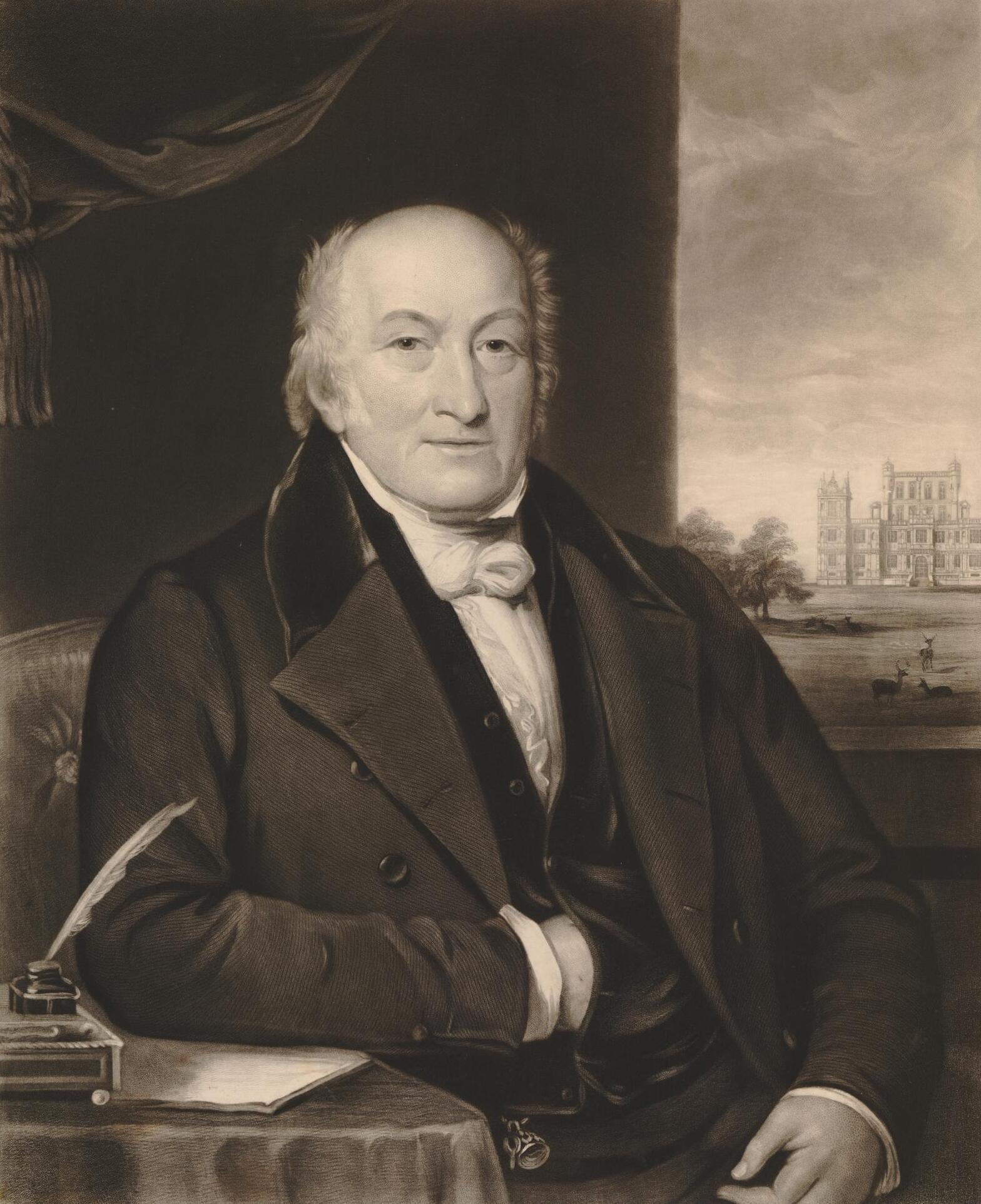
- Middleton in 1841
- Born: 26 November 1769
- Died: 5 November 1856 (aged 86); Wollaton Hall, Nottinghamshire
- Military career
- Allegiance: United Kingdom
- Branch: Royal Navy
- Service years: 1782–1840
- Rank: Captain
- Conflicts: French Revolutionary Wars; Glorious First of June

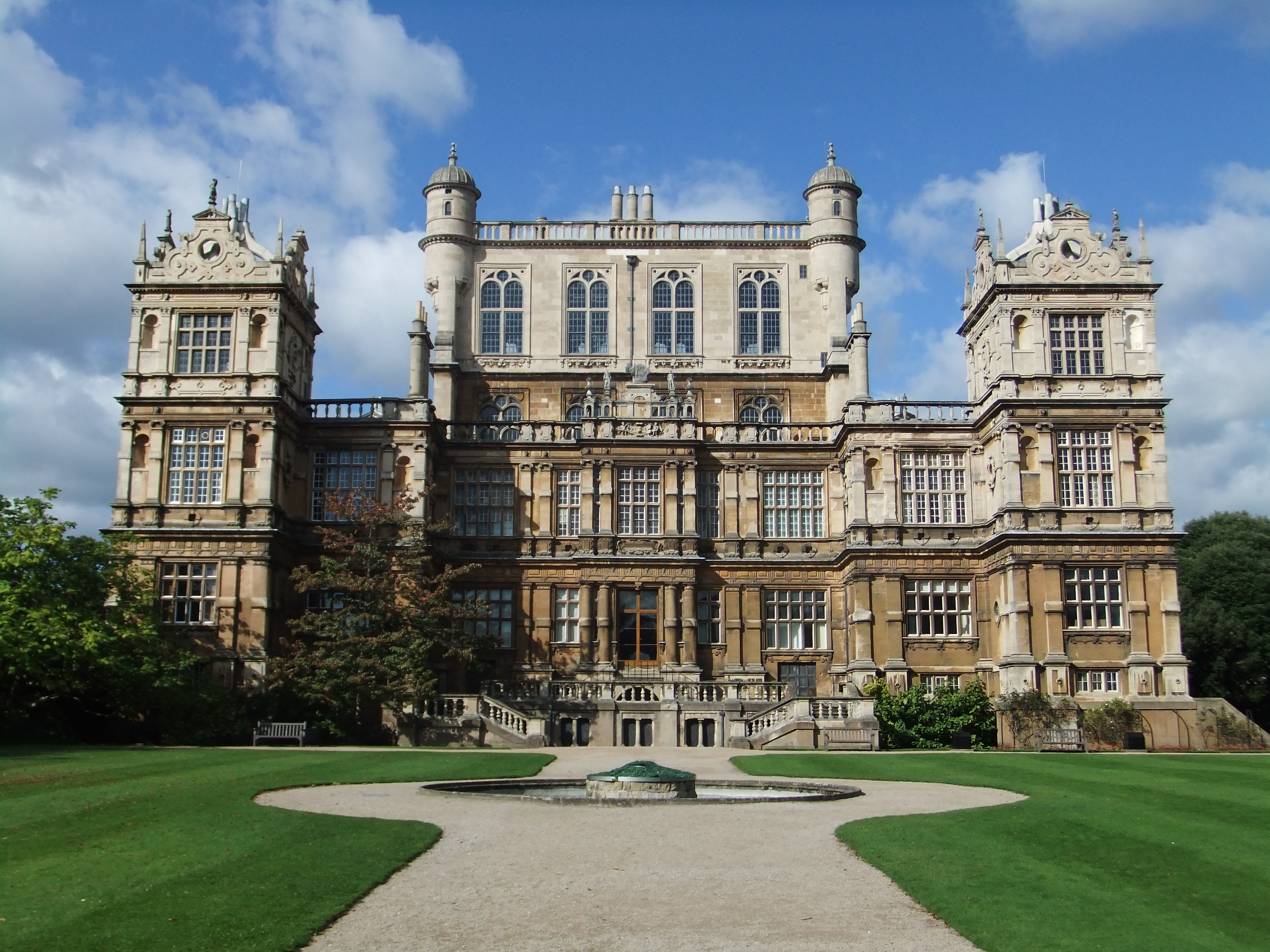
Wollaton Hall, Nottingham

Captain Digby Willoughby, 7th Baron Middleton (26 November 1769 – 5 November 1856) was a Royal Navy officer and peer.

== Biography ==
He was the eldest son of Francis Willoughby of Hesley and Octavia Fisher, and grandson of Thomas Willoughby.

He entered the Royal Navy in 1782, retiring as a captain in 1840.

He never married but had one illegitimate daughter, Octavia. He lived in the Willoughby family seat at Wollaton Park, Nottinghamshire.

== See also ==
- O'Byrne, William Richard (1849). "Willoughby, Digby" . A Naval Biographical Dictionary . John Murray – via Wikisource.

Peerage of Great Britain
Preceded by Henry Willoughby	Baron Middleton; 1835–1856	Succeeded by Henry Willoughby
