= Aldro =

Aldro may refer to:

- Aldro Hibbard (1886–1972), American plein air painter
- Aldro (footballer) (born 1972), Brazilian footballer
- Aldro School, is a coeducational day and boarding school for approximately 200 children aged between 7 and 13 in Shackleford, UK
- Aldro, North Yorkshire, a hamlet in North Yorkshire, England
