= Michael Willoughby, 12th Baron Middleton =

British peer

Major The Right Honourable The Lord Middleton MC

Member of the House of Lords
- Lord Temporal
- In office 16 November 1970 – 11 November 1999
- Preceded by: The 11th Baron Middleton
- Succeeded by: Seat abolished (Note: Pursuant to the House of Lords Act 1999.)

Personal details
- Born: Digby Michael Godfrey John Willoughby; 1 May 1921
- Died: 27 May 2011 (aged 90)
- Party: Conservative
- Other titles: 13th Baronet
- Military career
- Allegiance: United Kingdom
- Branch: British Army
- Service years: 1940–1946
- Rank: Major
- Units: 5th Battalion, Coldstream Guards
- Conflicts: World War II
- Awards: Military Cross; Croix de Guerre

Digby Michael Godfrey John Willoughby, 12th Baron Middleton (1 May 1921 – 27 May 2011), was a Conservative British peer who actively opposed the House of Lords Act 1999 which expelled most hereditary peers from the House of Lords. In addition to his service in the House of Lords, where he served as Chairman of the Food and Agriculture Subcommittee from 1989 to 1992, he was a veteran of World War II.

== Early life ==
Digby Michael Godfrey John Willoughby was born 1 May 1921 to Michael Willoughby, 11th Baron Middleton, and his wife Angela Florence Alfreda Hall, the eldest of four children. Through his great-grandmother, Julia Louisa Bosville (1824–1901), he is a direct descendant of Prince William Henry, Duke of Gloucester and Edinburgh, via his illegitimate daughter Maria Louisa. Raised at the family estate at Birdsall House in Malton he received his early education at Eton.

== Military career ==
In 1940 Willoughby received a commission to join the newly formed 5th Battalion of the Coldstream Guards assigned as a platoon commander of the 3rd Company under Captain A. R. G. Strutt. The 5th Battalion would be placed in the 32nd Guards Brigade which was formed in October 1941 as a defense against a possible German invasion. The brigade would remain in England until the invasion of Normandy in 1944.

On 20 June 1944, Willoughby, now a Captain, was serving as the second in command of the 2nd Company 5th Battalion assigned to the invasion force. Shortly after the landing, the commander of the 2nd Company, Major Hamilton, was wounded, forcing Captain Willoughby to assume command of the unit. In July, while being relieved by another unit, Willoughby and his men came under heavy fire. While facing this danger he evacuated the wounded, reorganized the forces and navigated through the darkness to save his men and preserve the mission. For his coolness and effectiveness in action he received the Croix de Guerre.

Promoted to Major, Willoughby would continue to serve with the 5th Battalion as Commander of the 2nd Company and participating in Operation Market Garden in support of the 82nd Airborne, then later the crossing of the Rhine. He would be discharged from the service in 1946 at which time the 5th Battalion was disbanded.

== Post-war years ==
Upon demobilization in 1946, Willoughby attended Trinity College, Cambridge, where he studied land management, graduating in 1950. Returning from Cambridge he became a land agent and assumed the management of the 12,000 acre family estate in Yorkshire. He would continue in this capacity until 1964 when he entered the local political arena.

In 1964, he was elected as a member of the East Riding County Council to represent his home Birdsall. He would remain on the County Council until 1974 when the County Council was reorganized according to the Local Government Act 1972. Following the reorganization he would continue to serve on the reorganized North Yorkshire County Council from 1974 until 1977. In addition to his service on the county council, he was a Deputy Lieutenant of North Yorkshire, served as a magistrate in the East Riding, and served as a member of Yorkshire and Humberside Economic Planning Council from 1968 to 1979.

In 1976, he served as President of Yorkshire Agricultural Society. As President he helped oversee the Great Yorkshire Show, where he was run-over by a demonstration troop of Danish Cavalry. He would also serve as President of the County Landowner's Association From 1981 to 1983.

Assuming the title of the 12th Baron Middleton in 1970, he entered the House of Lords. While in the Lords he was a member of the Conservative Party, chairing a sub-committee on agriculture and food from 1989 to 1992, and the select committee on European Communities from 1985 to 1997. He would leave the House of Lords in 1999 after refusing to stand for election to one of the remaining seats for hereditary peers following the House of Lords Act 1999.

== Political views ==
Regarding the issue of the United Kingdom's relationship to the European continent, he supported the idea of the European Economic Community as a trading bloc but opposed its political nature and its alteration into the European Union.

In 1979, he opposed a Labour dominated parliamentary committee's recommendation to abolish fox-hunting. The committee argued that such practices were barbaric. Willoughby argued that a ban on such sports "would have a serious effect on horse breeding, and the prosperity of its allied trades and professions, including country practices of veterinary surgeons." He again raised the same issue in 1983, noting "the threat to countryside sports, saying that a ban would mean the loss of 45,000 jobs which was equivalent to one quarter of the British agricultural labour force." In 1979 he also raised opposition to large corporations and institutions purchasing estates, noting that some existing laws were threatening the existence of hereditary land holders. Willoughby opposed the devolution of powers to Wales and Scotland, warning "that English regions would suffer if Scotland and Wales were given devolved government. He particularly pointed out that Scottish MPs would be able to vote in Westminster on English matters, but Westminster would not have the same power over Scotland."

In reference to the House of Lords Act 1999, the Telegraph notes he showed anger at "New Labour's eviction of all but a rump of hereditary peers from the House of Lords in 1999. He saw this as a vindictive and ill-thought-out assault on an institution which did its job well – but declined to put himself forward for one of the remaining hereditary places, preferring to make way for a younger generation."

== Marriage and children ==
Lord Middleton married Janet Denyse Marshall-Cornwall, daughter of General Sir James Marshall-Cornwall, on 14 October 1947. They had three sons:

- Michael Charles James Willoughby, 13th Baron Middleton (born 14 July 1948), married the Hon. Lucy Corinna Agneta Sidney, daughter of William Sidney, 1st Viscount De L'Isle
- Hon. John Hugh Francis Willoughby (born 13 July 1951)
- Hon. Thomas Henry Richard Willoughby (born 20 November 1955)

Lady Middleton died on 24 April 2015.

== Ancestry ==
Ancestors of Michael Willoughby, 12th Baron Middleton

16. Henry Willoughby
8. Henry Willoughby, 8th Baron Middleton
17. Charlotte Eyre
4. Godfrey Willoughby, 10th Baron Middleton
18. Alexander William Robert Bosville
9. Julia Louisa Bosville
19. Matilda Eliza Moffat Bayard
2. Michael Willoughby, 11th Baron Middleton
20. Hugh Rose
10. Lt.-Col. George William Holmes Rose of Cromarty
21. Catherine Munro
5. Ida Eleonora Constance Ross
22. Duncan Davidson, 4th of Tulloch
11. Adelaide Lucy Davidson
23. Hon. Elizabeth Diana Bosville Macdonald
1. Michael Willoughby, 12th Baron Middleton
6. Charles Oswin Hall
3. Angela Florence Alfreda Hall

== Notes ==
Peerage of Great Britain
Preceded by Michael Willoughby	Baron Middleton; 1970–2011; Member of the House of Lords (1970–1999)	Succeeded by Michael Willoughby
Baronetage of England
Preceded by Michael Willoughby	Baronet of Wollaton; 1970–2011	Succeeded by Michael Willoughby
