= 1st East Riding Artillery Volunteers =

1st East Riding Artillery Volunteers 1st East Riding RGA (V)
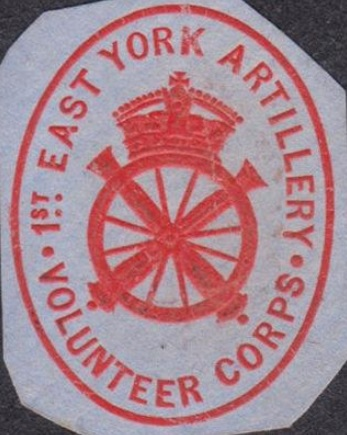
- Letterhead showing badge of the 1st East Yorkshire Artillery Volunteers, c. 1900
- Active: 1859–1908
- Country: United Kingdom
- Branch: Volunteer Force
- Role: Coast Artillery
- Garrison/HQ: Scarborough

Commanders
- Notable commanders: Digby Willoughby, 9th Baron Middleton

The 1st East Yorkshire Artillery Volunteers was a part-time unit of Britain's Royal Artillery based in the East Riding of Yorkshire, which also contained sub-units from the North and West Ridings. Created during an invasion scare in 1859–1860, it survived to supply units to the later Territorial Force of the 20th century.

== Early history ==
At times of national crisis, volunteers were regularly called upon to defend the vulnerable harbours on the coast of East Yorkshire. At the time of the Jacobite rising of 1745, the Wardens and Brethren of Hull Trinity House formed four volunteer artillery companies, equipped with 20 nine-pounder cannon from a ship lying in Hull Roads. These were the first volunteer artillery units formed in Yorkshire, though there may have been others manning the cannon in the fort covering Bridlington harbour. The companies were stood down after the Jacobite defeat at Culloden.

During the French Revolutionary Wars, a mixed unit of infantry and artillery manned the fort at Bridlington harbour from 1794 until the Treaty of Amiens in 1802, and reformed when the peace broke down in 1803. The Bridlington Volunteer Artillery disbanded in 1814.

== Volunteer Force ==
A number of new Artillery Volunteer Corps (AVCs) were formed in the East Riding during the first enthusiasm for the Volunteer Movement in 1859. The 1st Company East Yorkshire Artillery Volunteers formed at 'Burlington' (an alternative name for Bridlington) under Captain Benjamin Blaydes Haworth of Haworth Hall, Dunswell, on 9 December 1859, and the 2nd Company at Hunmanby under Captain Cortis on 9 February 1860. On 11 May, the following year the 1st and 2nd Companies combined to form the 1st Administrative Brigade of Yorkshire (East Riding) Artillery Volunteers, under the command of Haworth (promoted to major), with companies at Bridlington, Filey, Flamborough, Withernsea and Hornsea. The 2nd and 3rd North Riding AVCs, based on the coast at Whitby and Scarborough, and the 3rd West Riding AVC, based inland at York, were also included in the brigade, which had its headquarters at Scarborough. By 1872, it had assumed the following organisation:

- 2nd East Riding AVC at Filey (raised 9 February 1862)
- 5th East Riding AVC (raised 28 March 1869 by the Hornsea members of the 4th East Riding AVC at Hull; disbanded in late 1875)
- 6th East Riding AVC at Burlington (reorganised from the 1st East Riding AVC on 6 March 1869)
- 7th East Riding AVC at Flamborough (raised 6 March 1869)
- 2nd North Riding AVC at Whitby (raised 27 March 1860)
- 3rd North Riding AVC at Scarborough (raised 20 May 1861)
- 3rd West Riding AVC at York (raised 9 February 1861)

The commanding officer (CO) of the brigade, Major Haworth (who changed his name to Haworth-Booth in 1869) was promoted to lieutenant-colonel on 3 July 1861. Harcourt Vanden-Bempde-Johnstone (later 1st Baron Derwent), a former lieutenant in the 2nd Life Guards, was commissioned as Major of the brigade on 22 January 1863. The Adjutant, appointed on 15 January 1862, was Captain George Symons, who had won a Victoria Cross as a sergeant in the Royal Artillery during the Crimean War.

Henry Willoughby, 8th Baron Middleton, was appointed honorary colonel of the 1st Administrative Brigade on 17 December 1862, and his son the Hon. Digby Willoughby, (later 9th Baron), a former captain in the Scots Fusilier Guards, was appointed second major on 30 July 1869. The 9th Baron later commanded the unit as Lt-Col, became Hon Col in turn on 29 May 1879, and held the post into the 20th century.

== Reorganisation ==
The Volunteer Force was reorganised in 1880, in April, the administrative brigade was consolidated as the 2nd East Riding AVC, rapidly changing to 1st Yorkshire (East Riding) Artillery Volunteers, with the cumbersome (if accurate) subtitle of (East Riding, West Riding and North Riding). The unit had the following organisation:

- HQ at Scarborough
- No 1 Battery at Filey, formerly 2nd East Riding Corps
- No 2 Battery at Bridlington, formerly 6th East Riding Corps
- No 3 Battery at Flamborough, formerly 7th East Riding Corps
- No 4 Battery at Whitby, formerly 1st Bty, 2nd North Riding Corps
- No 5 Battery at Whitby, formerly 2nd Bty, 2nd North Riding Corps
- No 6 Battery at Scarborough, formerly 1st Bty 3rd North Riding Corps
- No 7 Battery at Scarborough, formerly 2nd Bty, 3rd North Riding Corps
- No 8 Battery at York, formerly 1st Bty, 3rd West Riding Corps
- No 9 Battery at York, formerly 2nd Bty, 3rd West Riding Corps

This was reduced to eight batteries in 1886, and seven by 1889. On 1 April 1882, all artillery volunteer units were affiliated to one of the territorial divisions of the Royal Artillery (RA) and the unit was assigned to the Northern Division. When the number of divisions was reduced from 1 July 1889, it changed to the Western Division. The unit's HQ moved to York in the 1880s, but returned to Scarborough by 1889.

As well as manning fixed coast defence artillery, some of the early Artillery Volunteers manned semi-mobile 'position batteries' of smooth-bore field guns pulled by agricultural horses. But the War Office refused to pay for the upkeep of field guns for Volunteers and they had largely died out in the 1870s. In 1888, the 'position artillery' concept was revived and some Volunteer companies were reorganised as position batteries to work alongside the Volunteer infantry brigades. On 14 July 1892, the 1st East Riding Volunteer Artillery were reorganised as a position battery and six companies.

By 1893, the War Office Mobilisation Scheme had allocated the Garrison Artillery companies to the Humber defences and its position battery of 40-pounder Armstrong rifled breechloading guns to the Western Counties Volunteer Field Brigade, which would concentrate around Guildford in the event of mobilisation.

On 1 June 1899, all the volunteer artillery units became part of the Royal Garrison Artillery (RGA) and with the abolition of the RA's divisional organisation on 1 January 1902 the unit was redesignated 1st East Riding of Yorkshire RGA (Volunteers) when the divisional structure was abolished.

== Territorial Force ==
With the creation of the Territorial Force by the Haldane Reforms in 1908, the RGA Volunteers were extensively reorganised. In the original plan, the 1st East Riding Artillery Volunteers would have formed two RGA units:

- Durham and Yorkshire RGA (in combination with the 4th Durham RGA)
- West Riding RGA

However, these plans were revised in 1910, so that the North and East Yorkshire portion of the proposed Durham and Yorkshire RGA instead joined the 2nd Northumbrian Brigade, Royal Field Artillery, providing the 3rd North Riding Battery at Scarborough and part of the brigade ammunition column.

The remainder of the 1st East Riding RGA, the batteries at York, became the West Riding Heavy Battery, RGA and its attendant ammunition column. This unit saw service during World War I and beyond, but no longer had any links with the East Riding.

== Insignia ==
Around 1859–60, the 1st East Riding AVC wore an embroidered forage cap badge consisting of crossed cannons surmounted by a crown and with a scroll underneath bearing the word 'BURLINGTON'. Waistbelt clasps and enrolment medals bore the same badge with a wheel superimposed on the crossed guns. An alternative brass forage cap badge comprised a grenade, with the figure '1' superimposed on a Yorkshire Rose on the ball.

== External sources ==
- London Gazette
- The Peerage.com
- Land Forces of Britain, the Empire and Commonwealth – Regiments.org (archive site)
