= High Steward of Sutton Coldfield =

Steward of Warwickshire, England

The High Steward of Sutton Coldfield was an office relating to the government of the town of Sutton Coldfield, Warwickshire, England.

== History ==
Prior to the Royal Charter of 1528 Walter Devereux, Lord Ferrers of Chartley held the office of High Steward under the Crown. He also held office as Bailiff of the Manor, Keeper of the Rolls and Keeper of Coldfield Walk. The salaries for these posts, under a grant of 1525, were to be paid at the rate of £16 a year to him and his son Henry for life.

On the granting of the Charter the town was to be held by a Warden and Society (roughly equivalent to Mayor and Corporation) and the inhabitants of the town. The Charter granted the right to appoint a High Steward, although this right was not exercised until 1547. The High Stewards were appointed for life and were to be entitled to a Deputy to assist in the duty of holding courts. At least in the 16th century, the High Steward was expected to have a knowledge of English law; but the role soon became symbolic and the duties largely ceremonial, and latterly the work was done entirely by Deputies.

The High Stewards were all persons of standing and mostly members of aristocratic Warwickshire and Staffordshire families.

In 1974 the Corporation of Sutton Coldfield merged with that of Birmingham and the office of High Steward became extinct.

== List of High Stewards ==
High Steward	Term of office		Other Peerage(s)	Monarch (Reign)
Sir John Throckmorton (1524–1580)	1547	1580 (Died in Office)		
Sir Henry Goodere (1534–1595)	1582	1595 (Died in Office)		
Sir Richard Repington (1534–1611)	1595	1611 (Died in Office)		
Robert Devereux, 3rd Earl of Essex (1591–1646)	1612	1646 (Died in Office)		
Sir Richard Newdigate (1602–1678)	1646	1678 (Died in Office)	Baronetcy from 24 July 1677	
Sir Thomas Thynne (1591–1646)	1679	1714 (Died in Office)	Viscount Weymouth from 11 December 1682	
Thomas Willoughby, 1st Baron Middleton (1672–1729)	1714	1729 (Died in Office)		
Francis Willoughby, 2nd Baron Middleton (1692–1758)	1729	1758 (Died in Office)		
Francis Willoughby, 3rd Baron Middleton (1726–1774)	1758	1774 (Died in Office)		
Thomas Willoughby, 4th Baron Middleton (1728–1781)	1774	1781 (Died in Office)		
Thomas Thynne, 3rd Viscount Weymouth (1734–1796)	1781	1796 (Died in Office)	Marquess of Bath from 18 August 1789	
Heneage Finch, 4th Earl of Aylesford (1751–1812)	1796	1812 (Died in Office)		
Henry Willoughby, 6th Baron Middleton (1761–1835)	1812	1835 (Died in Office)		
Heneage Finch, 5th Earl of Aylesford (1786–1859)	1835	1859 (Died in Office)		
William Henry Leigh, 2nd Baron Leigh (1824–1905)	1859	1905 (Died in Office)		
Sir John Benjamin Stone (1838–1914)	1905	1914 (Died in Office)		
Vacant 1914–1925
Sir Francis Newdegate (1862–1936)	1925	1936 (Died in Office)		
Sir Henry Ramsay Cameron Fairfax-Lucy, Bt. (1870–1944)	1936	1944 (Died in Office)		
Vacant 1944–1951
Rupert Leigh, 4th Baron Leigh (1908–1979)	1951	31 March 1974 (Abolished)		
