= Eliza Willoughby, Lady Middleton =

British poet

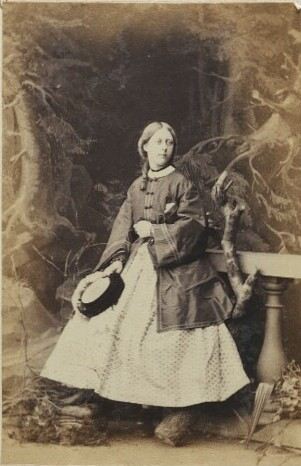
- Born: 16 June 1847; Moy House, Moray, Scotland
- Died: 27 April 1922 (aged 74); Birdsall House, Yorkshire
- Occupation: Writer
- Spouse: Digby Willoughby, 9th Baron Middleton (m. 1869)
- Parent(s): Sir Alexander Gordon-Cumming of Altyre, 3rd Baronet; Anne Pitcairn Campbell

Eliza Maria Gordon-Cumming Willoughby, Lady Middleton (16 June 1847 – 27 April 1922) was a Scottish poet.

Eliza Maria Gordon-Cumming was born on 16 June 1847, the daughter of Sir Alexander Penrose Gordon-Cumming, 3rd Baronet and Anne Pitcairn Campbell. In 1869, she married Digby Wentworth Bayard Willoughby, the future 9th Baron Middleton. She died on 27 April 1922 in Birdsall House.

== Bibliography ==
- On the North Wind, Thistledown (1874)
- Ballads (1878)
- The story of Alastair Bhan Comyn; or, The tragedy of Dunphail; a tale of tradition and romance (1889)
