= Michael Willoughby, 11th Baron Middleton =

British peer and army officer (1887–1970)

Colonel The Right Honourable The Lord Middleton KG MC KStJ TD ED

Member of the House of Lords
- Lord Temporal
- In office 11 November 1924 – 16 November 1970
- Preceded by: The 10th Baron Middleton
- Succeeded by: The 12th Baron Middleton

Personal details
- Born: Michael Guy Percival Willoughby; 21 October 1887
- Died: 16 November 1970 (aged 83)
- Other titles: 12th Baronet

Colonel Michael Guy Percival Willoughby, 11th Baron Middleton (21 October 1887 – 16 November 1970), was a British hereditary peer and soldier.

== Early life and barony ==
Born on 21 October 1887, Willoughby was the second son of the Honourable Ernest Willoughby and Ida Eleanora Constance Willoughby (née Ross); his father would become the 10th Baron Middleton in 1922, following the death of his elder brother in 1916. He was educated at Wellington College, in Berkshire, and at the Royal Military College, Sandhurst.

His elder brother had been killed at the Battle of Jutland in 1916 and so on the death of his father on 11 November 1924, Willoughby inherited the barony, becoming the 11th Baron Middleton. In 1925, he sold one of the family's estates, Wollaton Hall and Park, to the Nottingham Corporation for £200,000 (equivalent to £10.51 million in 2025). That same year, Willoughby and his wife established their home as Wood Brow in Malton, Yorkshire, in addition to the family seat of Birdsall House, near Malton.

In 1936, Willoughby was appointed Lord Lieutenant of the East Riding of Yorkshire. From 1931, he was President of University College, Hull (later the University of Hull), and was its first Chancellor from 1954 to 1970.

The 11th Baron Middleton died on 16 November 1970. A memorial service was held at York Minster on 3 December and was attended by a number of representatives of the royal family.

== Military career ==
Graduating from the Royal Military College on 9 October 1907, Willoughby was commissioned a second lieutenant in the South Lancashire Regiment (The Prince of Wales's Volunteers). He transferred to the 17th Lancers 26 October 1907 and on 26 October 1909 to the 10th Duke of Cambridge's Own Lancers (Hodson's Horse) of the Indian Army. He was promoted lieutenant 9 January 1910.

Willoughby was stationed in India at the outbreak of the First World War, as the regiment was not selected to go overseas, but in March 1915 he was sent to Mesopotamia attached to the 16th Cavalry, being promoted acting captain on 1 June 1915 and temporary captain 1 September 1915. He also served as the 6th Cavalry Brigades Machine Gun officer January to June 1916 before returning to the 16th Cavalry. In July 1916 he was attached to the 12th Cavalry until August when he returned to India to take over the 10th Duke of Cambridge's Own Lancers (Hodson's Horse) depot at Multan, that regiment now being selected for active service. In December 1916, it was announced that he had been awarded the Military Cross (MC) for "distinguished service in the Field in Mesopotamia". He was mentioned in dispatches three times: published in The London Gazette on 5 April 1916, 19 October 1916 and 12 June 1917.

He was promoted from acting captain to captain 9 October 1916, later to be antedated to 1 September 1915. While at Multan he led two scratch squadrons of the regiment on the Marri punitive expedition between March and April 1918 and appointed acting major commanding the depot 28 January to 12 August 1918. He was relieved of command of the depot in August 1918. He was acting major again whilst second in command of a regiment 26 October 1918 to 11 February 1919 and promoted brevet major 3 June 1919 and major 9 October 1922. He resigned his army commission 1 November 1923.

Lord Middleton rose through the ranks and became associated with Territorial regiments of the East Riding of Yorkshire. He first joined the Green Howards as a lieutenant colonel and was promoted colonel in 1928. He commanded the 5th and 30th Battalions of the East Yorkshire Regiment during the Second World War.

== Marriage and children ==
On 28 April 1920, Lord Middleton married Angela Florence Alfreda Hall, a daughter of Charles Hall, of Eddlethorpe. The couple had four children:

- (Digby) Michael Godfrey John Willoughby, 12th Baron Middleton (1921–2011)
- The Hon. Angela Hermione Ida Willoughby (b. 1924)
- The Hon. Jean Elizabeth Mary Willoughby (1928–2008), who married Sir Fergus Matheson, 7th Baronet and had issue.
- Brigadier the Hon. Henry Ernest Christopher Willoughby (1932–2009)

In 1925, Middleton discovered an early portrait of French painter Eugene Juillerat by John Singer Sargent, which Sargent had created when both were students of Carolus-Duran in Paris.

In 1957, Lord Middleton was appointed a Knight Companion of the Garter (KG). On his death in 1970, the barony passed to his elder son.

== Arms ==
Coat of arms of Michael Willoughby, 11th Baron Middleton
Coronet A Baron's Coronet Crest A man's head and shoulders proper Crined and bearded Sable wreathed around the temples Argent the ribands Gules vested paly of six Sable and Argent. Escutcheon Quarterly 1st and 4th Or fretty Azure (Willoughby); 2nd and 3rd Or on two bars Gules three water bougets Argent (Willoughby of Wollaton); a baronet's badge on the center fess point. Motto VERITE SANS PEUR

Honorary titles
Preceded by The Lord Deramore	Lord Lieutenant of the East Riding of Yorkshire; 1936–1968	Succeeded by The Earl of Halifax
Peerage of Great Britain
Preceded by Ernest Willoughby	Baron Middleton; 1924–1970; Member of the House of Lords (1924–1970)	Succeeded by Michael Willoughby
Baronetage of England
Preceded by Ernest Willoughby	Baronet of Wollaton; 1924–1970	Succeeded by Michael Willoughby
