= Francis Nethersole =

English diplomat and MP

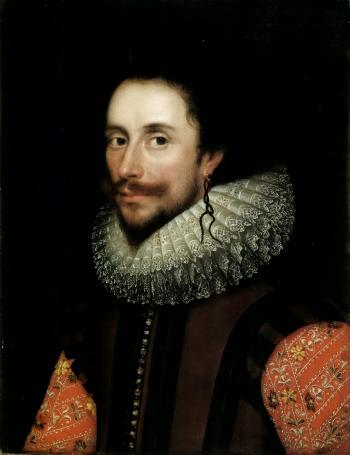
Portrait of a gentleman, probably Sir Henry Goodere, attributed to William Larkin

Sir Francis Nethersole (1587–1659) was an English diplomat, secretary to the Electress Elizabeth, Member of Parliament for Corfe Castle, and a Civil War political pamphleteer.

== Early life ==
Francis Nethersole was second son of John Nethersole of Winghamswood or Wimlingswold, Kent, by his wife Perigrinia, daughter of Francis Wilsford.

Nethersole was elected to a scholarship at Trinity College, Cambridge. After graduating M.A. in 1610, he became a popular tutor. On 11 December 1611 he was elected public orator of the university.

== Diplomatic service ==
In 1619 Nethersole resigned his offices at Cambridge, and accepted the post of secretary to James Hay, viscount Doncaster who had been selected to visit the Elector Palatine with a view to settling on a peaceful basis his relations with his catholic neighbours. Nethersole was a staunch protestant, and readily became an enthusiastic advocate of the cause of the elector and of his wife, the Princess Elizabeth Stuart.

On his return with Doncaster Nethersole was knighted at Theobalds, Hertfordshire, on 19 September 1619, and was at the same time appointed the English agent to the princes of the Protestant Union, and secretary to the Electress Palatine, in succession to Sir Albertus Morton. Nethersole did not take up his duties in attendance on the electress until her husband had accepted the crown of Bohemia. Late in the summer of 1620 he travelled to Prague, and practically became English minister at the court there.

His despatches to the English government were very full and frequent. He was at first sanguine that the elector would come forth victorious from the struggle, but in August 1620 he was writing to James I that his son-in-law's position was hopeless. In May 1621 the elector sent Nethersole to England to beg for aid in the defence of the Palatinate. He returned with an unfavourable answer (Green, Lives of the Princesses of England, v. 365). On 24 September 1622, four days after the fall of the elector's capital of Heidelberg, Nethersole landed again in England, and was dismissed a few days later by Buckingham, with an assurance that England would at once intervene in the German war in the elector's behalf. Next year, although still retaining his office as agent to the electress, Nethersole permanently settled in England, in the belief that he might thus influence the English government more effectually in her behalf. He maintained for the next twelve years a voluminous correspondence with the electress.

He was sent to Spain in September 1623 during the Spanish match with letters from Elizabeth of Bohemia. He probably met Prince Charles and the Duke of Buckingham at Segovia. His message concerned the potential marriage treaty, and an invitation for Buckingham to be godfather to Elizabeth's son.

== English Politician ==
Some of his leisure Nethersole now devoted to English politics. On 31 Jan 1623–4 he was elected M.P. for Corfe Castle, Dorset. He was re-elected for the same constituency to the first and third of Charles I's parliaments (in 1625 and 1628 respectively). In the opening days of the latter parliament Nethersole spoke against the king's claim to imprison persons without showing cause.

In May 1633, in his capacity of agent to the princess, Nethersole sought and obtained permission from Charles I to raise a voluntary contribution or benevolence for the recovery of the Palatinate. He induced two London merchants 'to advance 31,000l.' Before the legal documents authorising the levy of the money were made out, Nethersole's scheme was betrayed to the public. Charles was easily persuaded that Nethersole had misled him in the business. He at first ordered him to keep his house, then directed him to apologise formally, and finally revoked his assent.

== Imprisonment ==
In December 1633 Nethersole received from the private secretary of Elizabeth an importunate letter entreating him to secure aid for her in England with the utmost speed. Nethersole forwarded an extract from the letter to the king's secretary, Sir John Coke, and appended a message of his own supporting its appeal, in which he suggested that if no help were sent to the princess her son might be justified in attributing his ruin to her kinsfolk's inaction.

Charles, offended by the suggestion, sent Nethersole to the Tower.

Nethersole was released at the end of April, but not until Charles had obtained a formal promise from his sister, who had done what she could to defend him, never to employ him in her service again (cf. Cal. State Papers, Dom. 1633–4, p. 496; Cowper MSS. ii. 43–4 in Hist. MSS. Comm. 12th Rep.). His public life was thus brought to a premature close.

== Civil War Pamphleteer ==
Thenceforward Nethersole lived chiefly at Polesworth, Warwickshire, on property which his wife inherited. On 28 March 1636 he wrote thence to Secretary Windebanck, protesting in very humble language his loyalty to the king (Cal. State Papers, Dom. 1635–1636, p. 333). His religious views, always sternly protestant, in later life tended towards presbyterianism. He used his influence to obtain the vicarage of Polesworth for one Bell, subsequently one of the ejected ministers, and Richard Baxter wrote of Bell 'that he needed no other testimonial of his loyalty than that he was pastor to Sir Francis, and this is equally a proof of his learning also' (Palmer, Nonconformists' Memorial, iii. 347).

On his father's death he inherited Nethersole House, in the parish of Wimlingswold. Although he fully sympathised with the king's cause, he took no part in the civil wars; but in the autumn of 1648 he endeavoured, in a series of pamphlets, to advocate a peaceful solution of the desperate crisis.

- On 15 August 1648 he published, under the signature 'P.D.,' an address to the lord mayor, aldermen, and common councilmen of London, entitled 'Problems necessary to be determined by all that have or have not taken part on either side in the late unnatural War.’
- On 17 August 1648 he published 'A Project for an equitable and lasting Peace, designed in the yere 1643 … with a Disquisition how the said Project may now be reduced to fit the present Conjuncture of Affairs … by a cordiall Agreement of the King, Parliament, City, and Army, and of all the People of this Kingdom among our selves.'
- A strong Motive to the passing of a General Pardon and Act of Oblivion, found in a Parcell of Problemes selected out of a greater Bundle lately published by P. D. appeared on 30 October 1648; ‘
- Another Parcell of Problemes concerning Religion necessary to be determined at this time on 3 November 1648; and
- Parables reflecting upon the Times, newly past and yet present on 13 November 1648.

On 11 Jan 1648–9 Nethersole, throwing off the veil of anonymity, openly attacked John Goodwin's defence of the army's resolution to bring the king to the scaffold in 'Ὁ Αὐτοκατάκριτος. The self-condemned, or a Letter to Mr. Jo. Goodwin, shewing that in his Essay to justifie the Equity and Regularnes of the late and present Proceedings of the Army by Principles of Reason and Religion, he hath condemned himselfe of Iniquity and Variablenesse in the highest degree untill he shall explaine himself in publicke.' In a postscript, Nethersole avowed himself the author of the earlier pamphlets issued under the signature P. D.

== Retirement and legacies ==
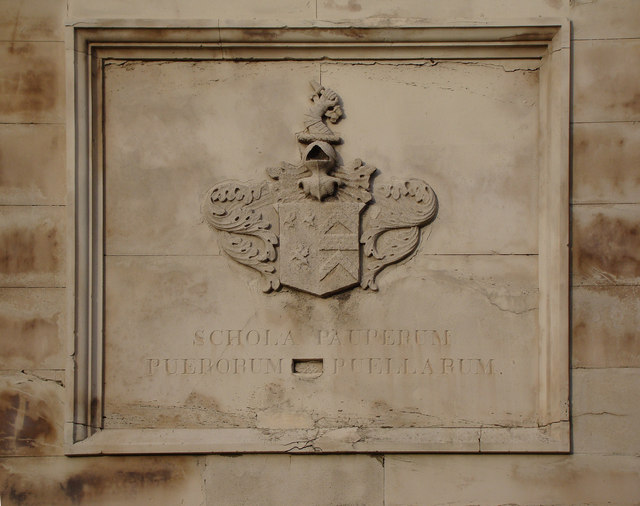
Heraldic tablet above the main door, Polesworth School, founded by Sir Francis Nethersole in 1655. Latin inscription "school of poor boys and girls". Arms of Nethersole: Per pale gules and azure, three griffins segreant or.

Nethersole married Lucy Goodere, a daughter and heiress of Sir Henry Goodere of Warwickshire in February 1620. She had been a member of the household of Lucy Russell, Countess of Bedford. Lucy Nethersole died on 9 July 1652, aged 58, and was buried in Polesworth Church.

In 1653 Nethersole, after protracted litigation, finally compounded for his estates. About the same time he built and endowed, in accordance with his wife's desire, a free school at Polesworth, and he endowed the benefice.

Francis Nethersole died at Polesworth in August 1659. An inscribed stone in his memory was placed in the church in 1859.

Francis and Lucy Nethersole had no children. The Nethersole line lives on today through the Nethersole-Thompson family, whose head Desmond Nethersole-Thompson (1908–1989) was Francis' nephew 14 generations back.
