= Francis Willoughby, 3rd Baron Middleton =

English nobleman

Francis Willoughby, 3rd Baron Middleton (25 January 1726 – 16 December 1774), was an English nobleman, the eldest son of Francis Willoughby, 2nd Baron Middleton.

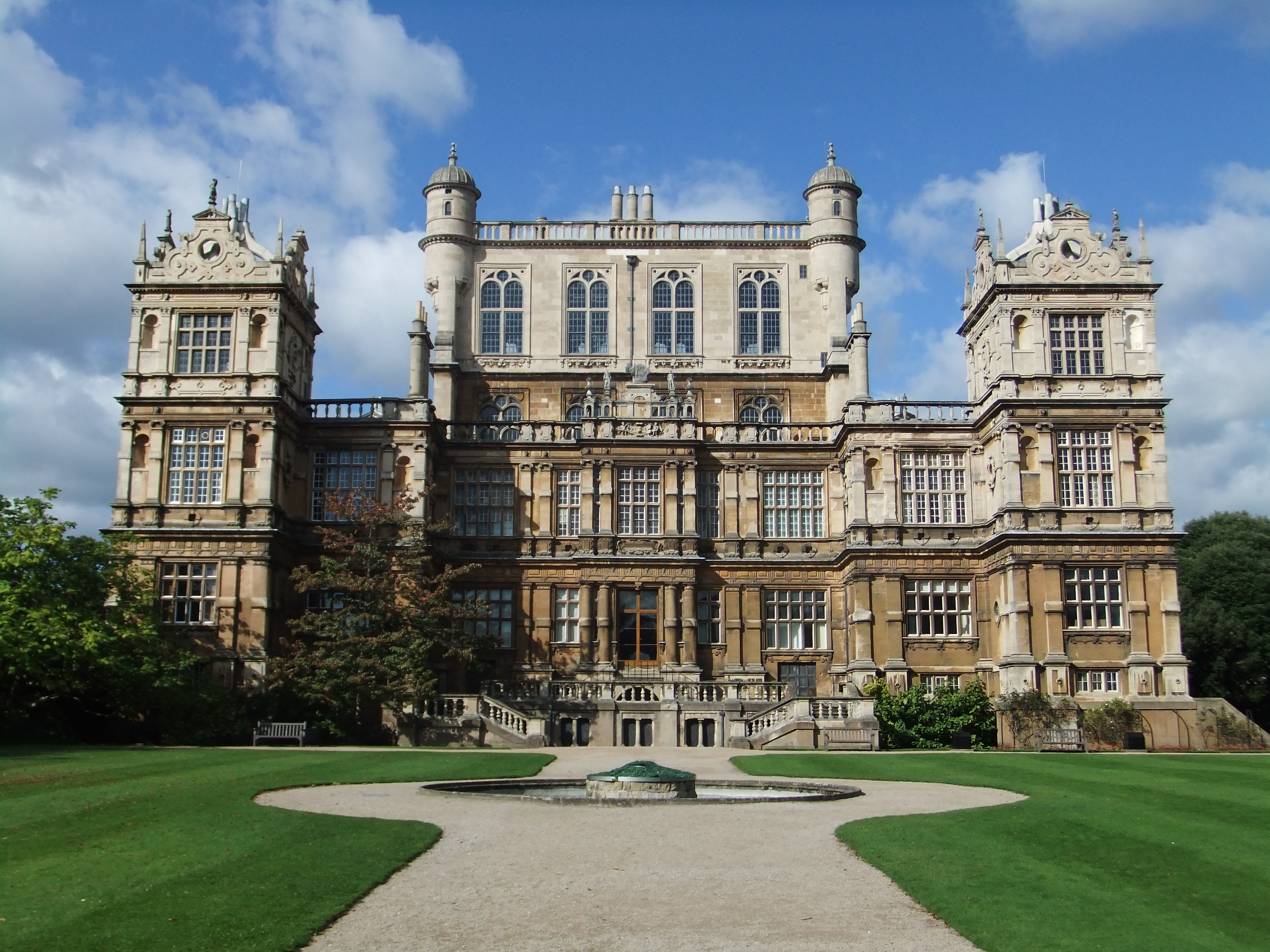
Wollaton Hall, Nottingham

He was educated at Bury St Edmund's School, and entered Jesus College, Cambridge, in 1744. He succeeded his father in 1758, inheriting the family seat at Wollaton Park, Nottinghamshire, where he subsequently lived.

He died unmarried and was succeeded by his younger brother, Thomas Willoughby, 4th Baron Middleton.

Honorary titles
Preceded by The 2nd Lord Middleton	High Steward of Sutton Coldfield; 1758–1774	Succeeded by The 4th Lord Middleton
Peerage of Great Britain
Preceded by Francis Willoughby	Baron Middleton; 1758–1774	Succeeded by Thomas Willoughby
