= John Throckmorton (died 1580) =

16th-century English politician and lawyer

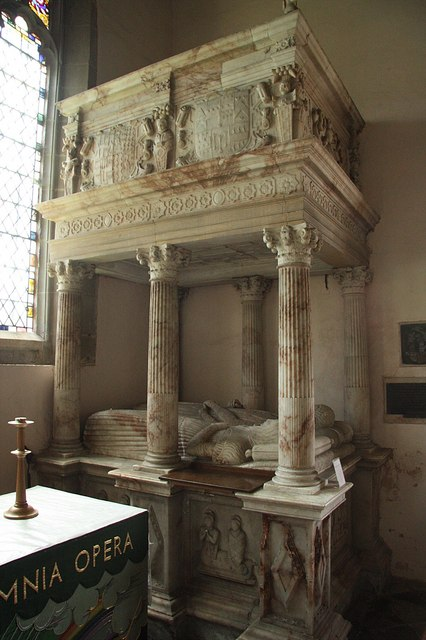
Monument with effigies of Sir John Throckmorton and his wife Margaret Puttenham, SE corner of chancel, Coughton Church, Warwickshire

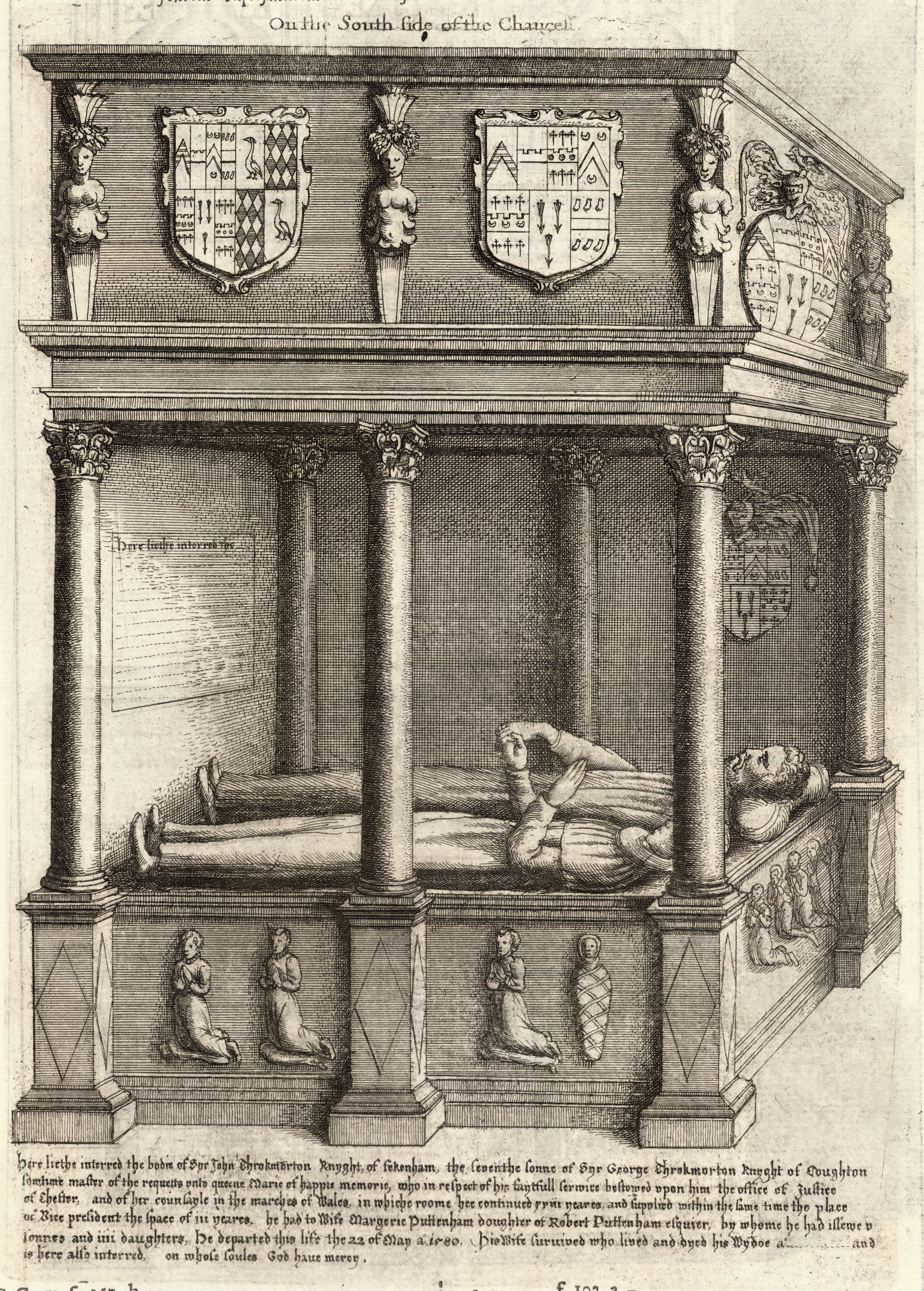
Monument with effigies of Sir John Throckmorton and his wife Margaret Puttenham, SE corner of chancel, Coughton Church, Warwickshire, drawn by Wenceslaus Hollar (died 1677)

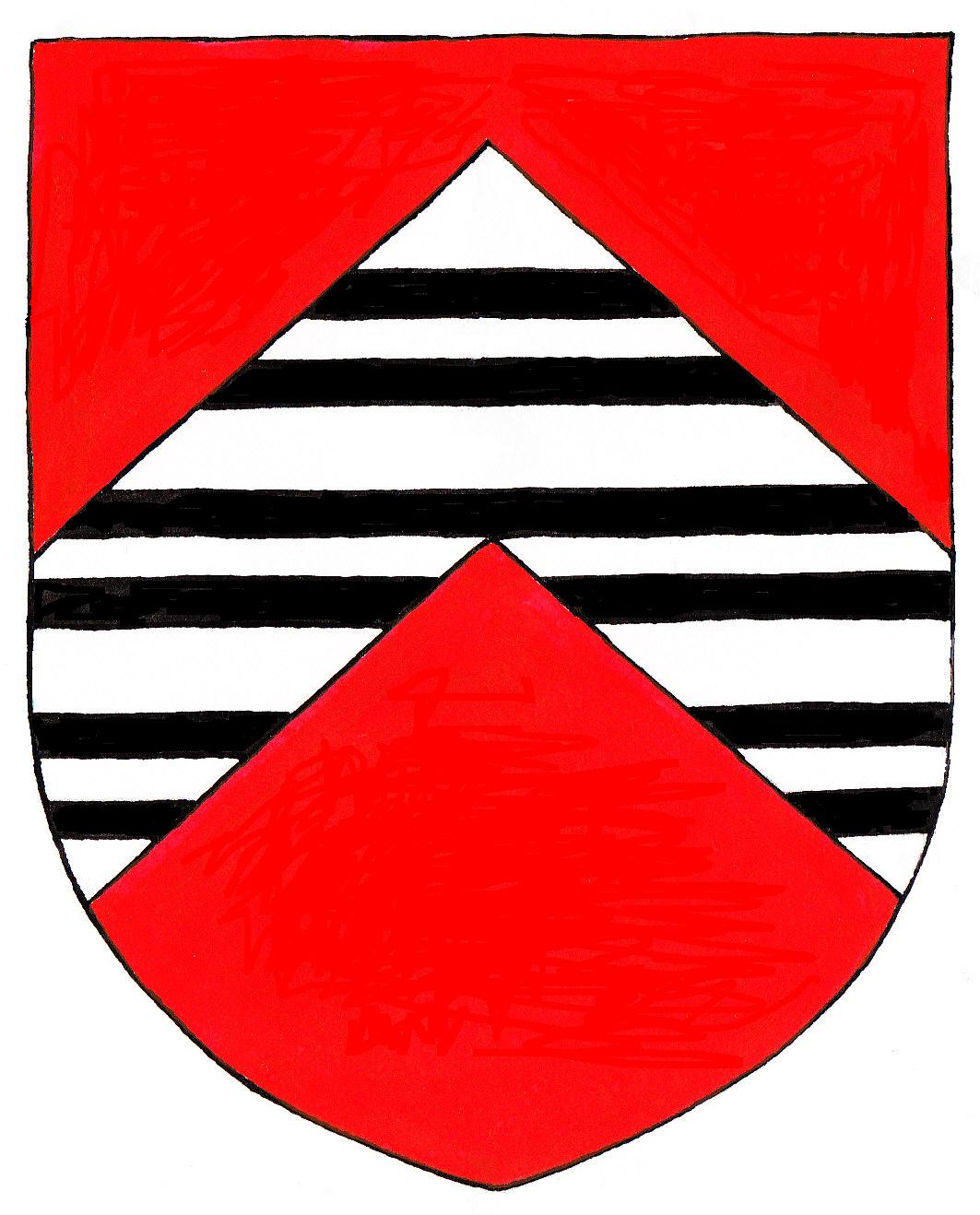
Arms of Throckmorton: Gules, on a chevron argent three bars gemelles sable. Crest: A falcon rising proper belled and jessed or. Mottos: (1): Virtus Sola Nobilitas (Virtue is the only nobility); (2): Moribus Antiquis (With ancient manners)

Sir John Throckmorton (by 1524 – 22 May 1580) was a lawyer and member of the English Parliament during the reign of Queen Mary I. He was also a witness to Queen Mary's will.

== Biography ==
He was the seventh son of Sir George Throckmorton (d. 1552) of Coughton Court in Warwickshire and trained in the law becoming an Inner Temple barrister. His mother, Katherine Vaux was the half-sister of Sir Thomas Parr, making John a cousin to Queen Katherine Parr.

His maternal grandparents were Nicholas Vaux, 1st Baron Vaux of Harrowden and Elizabeth FitzHugh.

He married Margaret, the sister of George Puttenham, the reputed author of 'The Arte of English Poesie'. She had links with the influential Grey family of Leicestershire.

Sir John was MP for Leicester (1545), Camelford (1547), Warwick (Mar 1553), Old Sarum (Oct 1553) and then four times for Coventry (1554, 1555, 1558 and 1559). He was, in 1547, the first High Steward of the Royal Town of Sutton Coldfield appointed after the 1528 Royal Charter; and with the help of his patron, the Duke of Northumberland, he became attorney to the Council in the Marches of Wales in 1550. He later held various legal positions including Recorder of Coventry, Worcester, Ludlow, and Shrewsbury. During the reign of Queen Mary I (1553–1558) he was one of the two Masters of Requests. He was knighted in 1565 but later fell out of favour. His career ended in disgrace after he was found guilty of giving a judgement in favour of a relative.

He is remembered more for his connections than his own achievements:

- His brother Sir Nicholas Throckmorton (1515–1571) was involved with the Wyatt Rebellion of 1554. His eldest brother was Sir Robert Throckmorton (1513–1581) of Coughton.
- A relative, John Throckmorton of Tortworth, Gloucestershire, MP for Wootton Bassett, was executed for involvement in the Dudley conspiracy of 1555.
- His son, Francis Throckmorton, was executed for treason for his part in the Throckmorton Plot of 1584.

Honorary titles
New title	High Steward of Sutton Coldfield; 1547–1582	Succeeded by Henry Goodere
