= Baron Middleton =

Barony in the Peerage of Great Britain

- Quarterly, 1st & 4th: Or fretty azure (for Willoughby of Parham and Eresby); 2nd & 3rd: Or on two bars gules three water bougets argent, two and one (for Willoughby of Middleton and Wollaton, formerly Bugge)
- Creation date: 1 January 1711
- Created by: Queen Anne
- Peerage: Peerage of Great Britain
- First holder: Sir Thomas Willoughby, 2nd Baronet
- Present holder: Michael Willoughby, 13th Baron Middleton
- Heir apparent: Hon. James Willoughby
- Seat: Birdsall House
- Former seats: Middleton Hall; Wollaton Hall
- Motto: Vérité sans peur ("True without fear")

Baron Middleton, of Middleton in the County of Warwick, is a title in the Peerage of Great Britain, created in December 1711 for Sir Thomas Willoughby, 2nd Baronet, who had previously represented Nottinghamshire and Newark in Parliament. It was one of twelve new peerages created together and known as Harley's Dozen, to give a Tory majority in the House of Lords.

The Willoughby baronetcy, of Wollaton in the County of Nottingham, had been created in the Baronetage of England in 1677, for the first baron's elder brother Francis Willoughby, who at the time was aged only about nine, with special remainder to him, the first baronet's only brother, and he duly succeeded him when his brother died at the age of twenty in 1688. Their father, the landowner and naturalist Francis Willughby (1635–1672), of Middleton Hall, Warwickshire, had died when they were both small children.

The first Lord Middleton was followed by his eldest son, the second Baron (1692–1758), who had previously sat as one of the Members of Parliament for Nottinghamshire and Tamworth. He was succeeded by his son, the third baron, who died unmarried, and then by a younger son, the fourth Baron. The direct line then failed, and Henry Willoughby, 5th Baron Middleton (1726–1800), was the son of the Hon. Thomas Willoughby (c. 1694–1742), second son of the first Baron. On the death of his son, the sixth Baron (1761–1835), this line also failed.

Digby Willoughby, 7th Baron Middleton (1769–1856), a captain in the Royal Navy, was a grandson of the second son of the first Baron. He died unmarried and was succeeded by his cousin once removed, the eighth Baron, the grandson of Reverend the Hon. James Willoughby, younger son of Thomas Willoughby, second son of the first Baron. He was succeeded by his eldest son, the ninth Baron, who in his turn was succeeded by his younger brother, the 10th Baron. On the latter's death, the titles passed to his second but eldest surviving son, the 11th Baron. He was Lord Lieutenant of the East Riding of Yorkshire. Since 2011, the titles are held by his grandson, the 13th Baron.

Extensive estate and personal papers of the Willoughby family are held in the Middleton collection at the department of Manuscripts and Special Collections, University of Nottingham. They include the Wollaton Antiphonal.

The current family seat is Birdsall House, near Malton, North Yorkshire. The Middleton family owned Wollaton Hall, a stately home near Nottingham on which Mentmore Towers was based, and Middleton Hall in Warwickshire until they were sold by the 11th Baron in the 1920s.

== Middleton baronets, of Wollaton (1677) ==
- Sir Francis Willoughby, 1st Baronet, of Wollaton (1668–1688)
- Sir Thomas Willoughby, 2nd Baronet, of Wollaton (1670–1729) (created Baron Middleton in 1711)

=== Barons Middleton (1711) ===
- Thomas Willoughby, 1st Baron Middleton (1670–1729)
- Francis Willoughby, 2nd Baron Middleton (1692–1758)
- Francis Willoughby, 3rd Baron Middleton (1726–1774)
- Thomas Willoughby, 4th Baron Middleton (1728–1781)
- Henry Willoughby, 5th Baron Middleton (1726–1800)
- Henry Willoughby, 6th Baron Middleton (1761–1835)
- Digby Willoughby, 7th Baron Middleton (1769–1856)
- Henry Willoughby, 8th Baron Middleton (1817–1877)
- Digby Wentworth Bayard Willoughby, 9th Baron Middleton (1844–1922)
- (Godfrey) Ernest Percival Willoughby, 10th Baron Middleton (1847–1924)
- Michael Guy Percival Willoughby, 11th Baron Middleton (1887–1970)
- (Digby) Michael Godfrey John Willoughby, 12th Baron Middleton (1921–2011)
- Michael Charles James Willoughby, 13th Baron Middleton (b. 1948)

The heir apparent is the present holder's eldest son, the Hon. James William Michael Willoughby (b. 1976).
The heir apparent's heir, and next in line, is his elder son, Thomas Michael Jonathan Willoughby (b. 2007).

=== Title succession chart ===
Francis Willughby; 1635–1672
Willoughby baronetcy	Baron Middleton
Francis Willoughby; 1st Baronet; 1668–1688	Thomas Willoughby; 1st Baron Middleton; 2nd Baronet; 1670–1729
Francis Willoughby; 2nd Baron Middleton; 1692–1758	Hon. Thomas Willoughby; 1694–1742
Francis Willoughby; 3rd Baron Middleton; 1726–1774	Thomas Willoughby; 4th Baron Middleton; 1728–1781	Thomas Willoughby; 1726–1748	Henry Willoughby; 5th Baron Middleton; 1726–1800	Francis Willoughby; 1727–?	Rothwell Willoughby; 1729–1764	Rev. Hon. James Willoughby; 1731–1816
Henry Willoughby; 6th Baron Middleton; 1761–1835	Digby Willoughby; 7th Baron Middleton; 1769–1856	Francis Willoughby; 1771 – b. 1856	Henry Willoughby; 1780–1849
Henry Willoughby; 8th Baron Middleton; 1817–1877
Digby Willoughby; 9th Baron Middleton; 1844–1922	Ernest Willoughby; 10th Baron Middleton; 1847–1924
Cdr. Henry Willoughby; 1882–1916	Michael Willoughby; 11th Baron Middleton; 1887–1970
Michael Willoughby; 12th Baron Middleton; 1921–2011
Michael Willoughby; 13th Baron Middleton; 14th Baronet born 1948
Hon. James Willoughby born 1976

=== Line of succession ===
Line of succession
- Thomas Willoughby, 1st Baron Middleton (1670–1729)
  - Francis Willoughby, 2nd Baron Middleton (1692–1758)
    - Francis Willoughby, 3rd Baron Middleton (1726–1774)
    - Thomas Willoughby, 4th Baron Middleton (1728–1781)
  - Hon. Thomas Willoughby (1694–1742)
    - Henry Willoughby, 5th Baron Middleton (1726–1800)
      - Henry Willoughby, 6th Baron Middleton (1761–1835)
    - Francis Willoughby (1727–?)
      - Digby Willoughby, 7th Baron Middleton (1769–1856)
    - Rev. Hon. James Willoughby (1731–1816)
      - Henry Willoughby (1780–1849)
        - Henry Willoughby, 8th Baron Middleton (1817–1877)
          - Digby Willoughby, 9th Baron Middleton (1844–1922)
          - Ernest Willoughby, 10th Baron Middleton (1847–1924)
            - Michael Willoughby, 11th Baron Middleton (1887–1970)
              - Michael Willoughby, 12th Baron Middleton (1921–2011)
                - Michael Willoughby, 13th Baron Middleton (b. 1948)
                  - (1) Hon. James Willoughby (b. 1976)
                    - (2) Thomas Willoughby (b. 2007)
                    - (3) Rupert Willoughby (b. 2011)
                  - (4) Hon. Charles Willoughby (b. 1986)
                - (5) Hon. John Willoughby (b. 1951)
                - (6) Hon. Thomas Willoughby (b. 1955)
              - Brigadier Hon. Henry Willoughby (1932–2009)
                - (7) Guy Willoughby (b. 1960)
                  - (8) James Willoughby (b. 1999)
        - Rev. Hon. Charles Willoughby (1822–1875)
          - James Willoughby (1856–1947)
            - Commander Ronald Willoughby (1884–1971)
              - (9) Christopher Willoughby (b. 1938)
            - Rev. Bernard Willoughby (1896–1997)
              - (10) Colin Willoughby (b. 1949)
                - (11) Philip Willoughby (1993)
        - Rev. Hon. Percival Willoughby (1827–1913)
          - Colonel Herbert Willoughby (1853–1913)
            - (12) Major John Willoughby (b. 1942)
              - (13) John Willoughby (b. 1967)
          - Rev. Nesbit Willoughby (1854–1919)
            - Lawrence Willoughby (1908–1980)
              - (14) Guy Willoughby (b. 1958)
