= Thomas Willoughby, 4th Baron Middleton =

British politician and nobleman

The Right Honourable The Lord Middleton
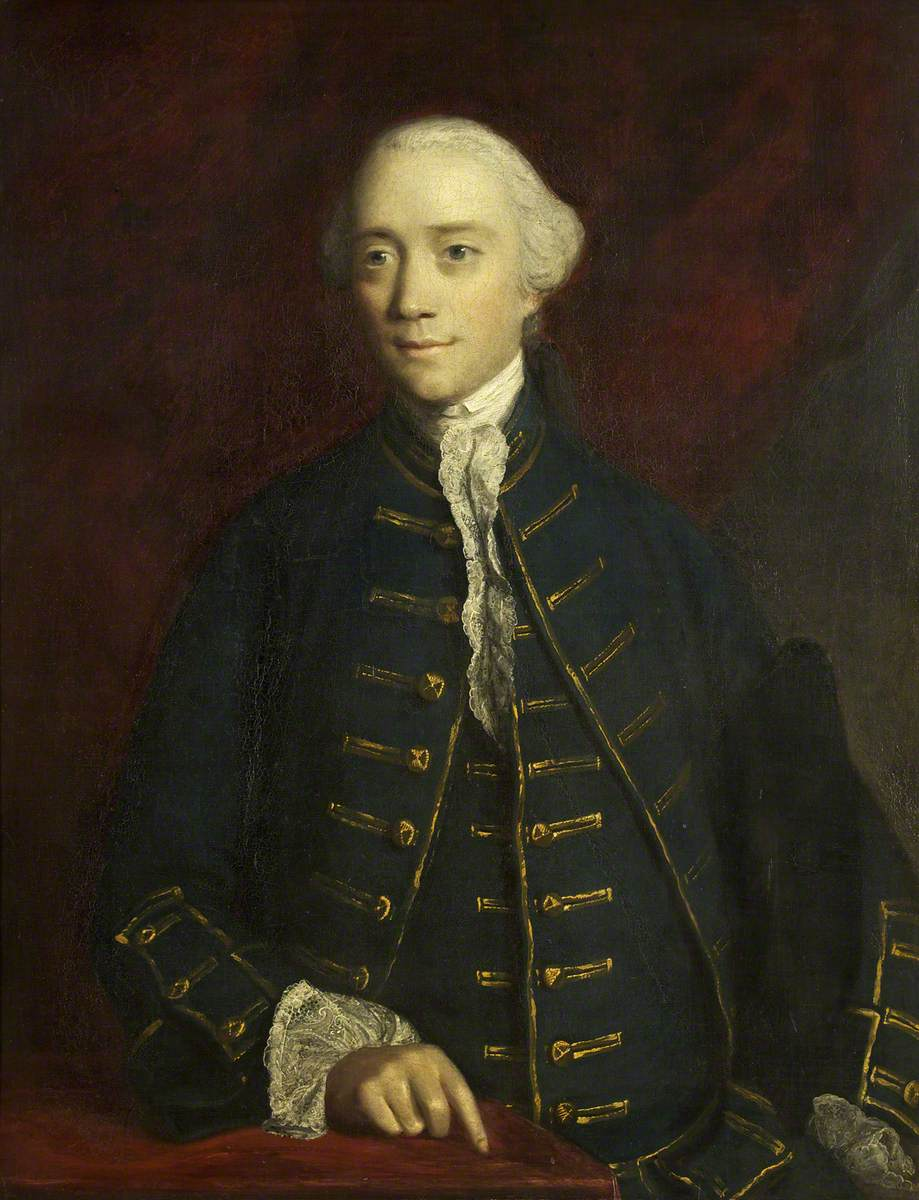
- Portrait of Middleton in 1761, by Joshua Reynolds

Member of Parliament for Nottinghamshire
- In office 1762–1774

Personal details
- Born: 19 December 1728
- Died: November 2, 1781 (aged 52)
- Relations: Francis Willoughby, 2nd Baron Middleton (father); Francis Willoughby, 3rd Baron Middleton (brother)
- Education: Jesus College, Cambridge

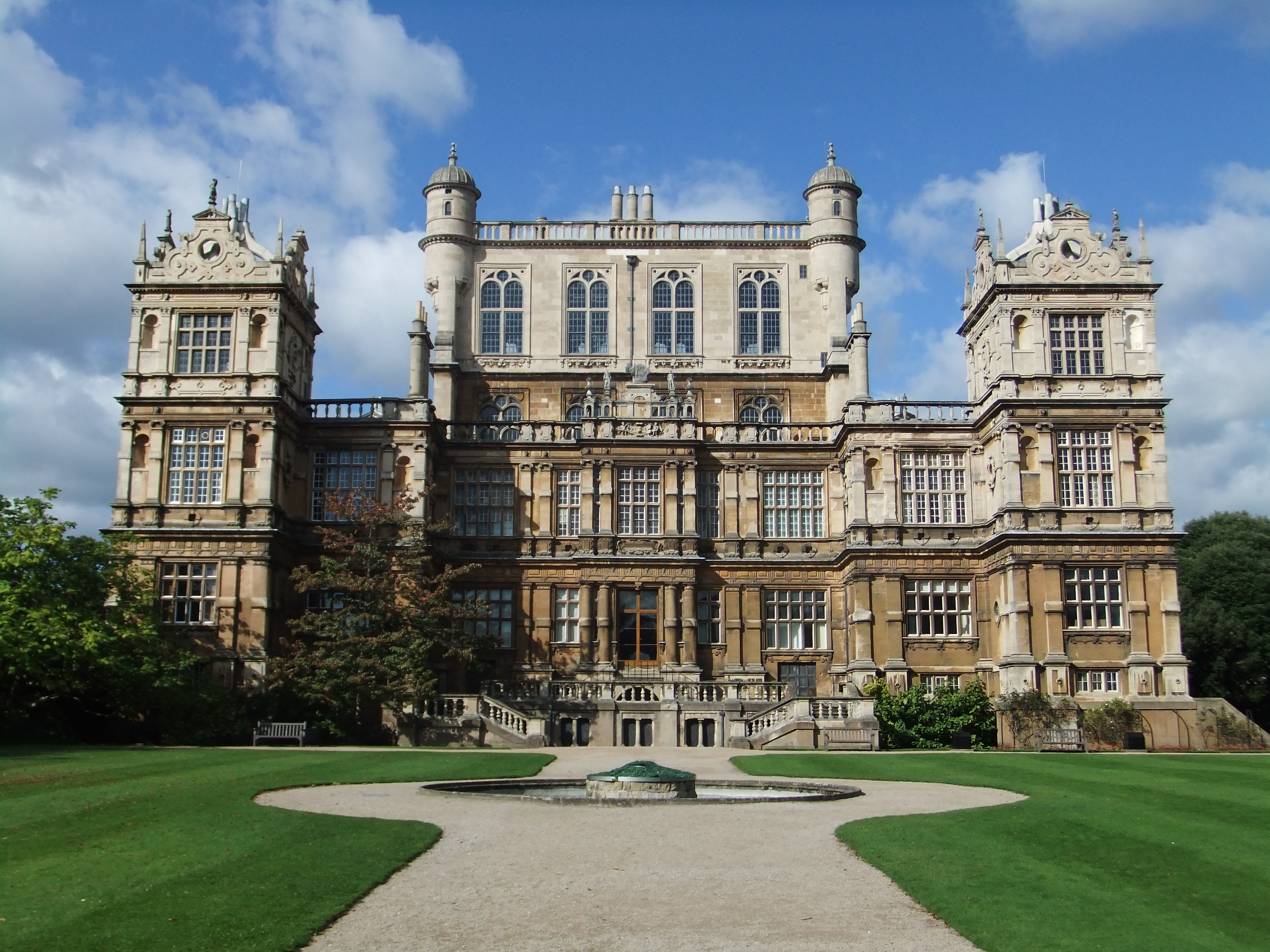
Wollaton Hall, Nottingham

Thomas Willoughby, 4th Baron Middleton (19 December 1728 – 2 November 1781), was a British politician who sat in the House of Commons from 1762 to 1774, when he succeeded to the peerage as Baron Middleton.

Willoughby was the second son of Francis Willoughby, 2nd Baron Middleton. He was educated at Bury St Edmund's School, and entered Jesus College, Cambridge, in 1745.

Willoughby was returned unopposed as Member of Parliament for Nottinghamshire at a by-election on 13 December 1762. He was returned unopposed again at the general elections of 1768 and 1774.

When his brother died on 16 December 1774 he succeeded to the Barony and was called to the House of Lords.

He married Georgina, daughter of Evelyn Chadwick of West Leake, Nottinghamshire, in 1770 and lived in the family seat at Wollaton Park, Nottinghamshire. They had no children and was succeeded in the barony and estates by his cousin, Henry Willoughby, 5th Baron Middleton.

Parliament of Great Britain
Preceded by Lord Robert Manners-Sutton; John Thornhagh	Member of Parliament for Nottinghamshire; 1762–1774; With: John Thornhagh 1762–1774; Earl of Lincoln 1774	Succeeded by Earl of Lincoln; Lord Edward Bentinck
Honorary titles
Preceded by The Lord Middleton	High Steward of Sutton Coldfield; 1774–1781	Succeeded by The Marquess of Bath
Peerage of Great Britain
Preceded by Francis Willoughby	Baron Middleton; 1774–1781	Succeeded by Henry Willoughby
