= St Mary's Church, Birdsall =

Church in Birdsall, North Yorkshire, England

Coordinates: 54°04′41″N 0°45′02″W

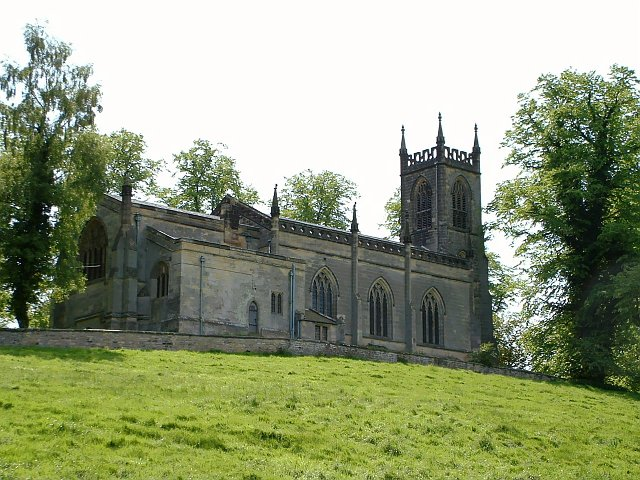
The church, in 2004

St Mary's Church is the parish church of Birdsall, North Yorkshire, a village in England.

St Mary's Church was first recorded in 1130. By the early 19th century, it was in poor repair. In 1824, it was demolished and rebuilt for Henry Willoughby, 6th Baron Middleton, to a design by James Pigott Pritchett and Charles Watson. Between 1879 and 1881, C. Hodgson Fowler added a chancel and an additional stage to the tower. The church was Grade II listed in 1966.

The Gothic revival church is built of limestone. It consists of a three-bay nave, with a boiler house to the north, a two-bay chancel with an organ chamber to the north, and a west tower. The tower has three stages, diagonal stepped buttresses, a semi-octagonal stair turret to the north, string courses, and an openwork parapet with octagonal corner turrets and finials. On the lowest stage is a window with a pointed head on the west side, and on the south side is a doorway with a pointed head, a hood mould with crockets, and a bas-relief with two figures and a coat of arms. In the middle stage are lancet windows, and above, the bell openings have three lights. Along the nave are pierced parapets. The east window has a five-light window, and below it is a door providing access to the crypt.

Inside the church are numerous memorials, including a 14th century recumbent figure of a woman, two black marble monuments from the late 17th century, a plaque to Thomas Southeby, designed by John Michael Rysbrack, and a white marble model of a kneeling woman, designed by Richard Westmacott. John Betjeman described the church as having "good modern glass".

== See also ==
- Listed buildings in Birdsall, North Yorkshire
