= Birdsall, North Yorkshire =

Village and civil parish in North Yorkshire, England

Coordinates: 54°04′34″N 0°44′59″W

Birdsall
- Location within North Yorkshire
- Population: 343 (Including Langton. 2011 census)
- OS grid reference: SE818659
- Civil parish: Birdsall
- Unitary authority: North Yorkshire
- Ceremonial county: North Yorkshire
- Region: Yorkshire and the Humber
- Country: England
- Sovereign state: United Kingdom
- Post town: MALTON
- Postcode district: YO17
- Police: North Yorkshire
- Fire: North Yorkshire
- Ambulance: Yorkshire
- UK Parliament: Thirsk and Malton

Birdsall is a village and civil parish in North Yorkshire, England. According to the 2001 census it had a population of 180, increasing to 343 at the 2011 Census. The village is about four miles south of Malton and the parish also includes the village of North Grimston.

It was historically part of the East Riding of Yorkshire until 1974, between 1974 and 2023 it was part of the Ryedale district. It is now administered by the unitary North Yorkshire Council.

== Birdsall House ==
Birdsall House is the seat of Baron Middleton. Thomas Willoughby (1694–1742), brother of Francis Willoughby, 2nd Baron Middleton, married Elizabeth Sotheby of Birdsall, and their son Henry inherited the barony and Willoughby estates in Nottinghamshire and Warwickshire from his cousin in 1781.

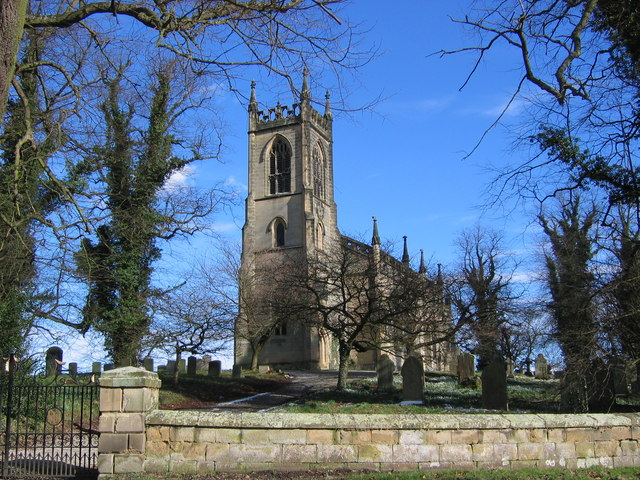
St Mary's Church, Birdsall

== Church of All Hallows and Cross ==
The ruins of the ancient church of All Hallows and Cross stand adjacent to Birdsall House. The present St Mary's Church was built in 1824 at the expense of Henry Willoughby, 6th Baron Middleton.

== See also ==
- Listed buildings in Birdsall, North Yorkshire
