= Henry Goodere (politician) =

English knight (1534–1595)

Sir Henry Goodere (1534–1595) was an English landowner, Member of Parliament for Stafford (1563) and Coventry (1571), and a supporter of Mary, Queen of Scots.

== Family background ==
Goodere was the son of Francis Goodere of Polesworth Hall and Ursula Rowlett.

== Career ==
Goodere went to meet Mary, Queen of Scots in 1568 at Workington when she first came into England from Scotland. He gave her a cipher code to write to her friends.

Goodere was held in the Tower of London in 1571 and interviewed by his family relative William Cecil and the Earl of Southampton on suspicion of treason, in connection with a plan for Mary to marry the Duke of Norfolk and the Ridolfi plot. He was questioned about a plan for Mary to escape and be escorted by Gerard Lowther to one of his houses, a former abbey.

Goodere wrote a poem defending the Scottish queen, "If former good could answer present ill". His political enemy Thomas Norton responded to the poem with another verse.

Goodere was released and subsequently knighted in 1588. He became the Queen's chief bodyguard. He was High Sheriff of Warwickshire in 1570 and High Steward of the Royal Town of Sutton Coldfield from 1582 until his death.

== Family and namesake son-in-law ==
Goodere married Frances Lowther. Her father, Richard Lowther, was also questioned about the cipher given to Mary. Their daughter was Frances Goodere. She married Henry Goodere (died 1627). The younger Henry Goodere was the founder of "the Polesworth Circle", a private organization that influenced most of Great Britain through Shakespeare's literary works, Inigo Jones' architectural work and Michael Drayton's poetry. He was friends with John Donne. His society helped finance the 'Virginia adventure'.

Honorary titles
Preceded by Sir John Throckmorton	High Steward of Sutton Coldfield; 1582–1595	Succeeded by Richard Repington
