= William Garforth =

English cricketer and British Army officer

Personal information
- Full name: William Henry Garforth
- Born: 14 January 1855; Otterington, Yorkshire, England
- Died: 15 June 1931 (aged 76); Malton, Yorkshire, England
- Batting: Unknown

Career statistics
| Competition | First-class |
|---|---|
| Matches | 1 |
| Runs scored | 0 |
| Batting average | 0.00 |
| 100s/50s | –/– |
| Top score | 0 |
| Balls bowled | 12 |
| Wickets | 0 |
| Bowling average | – |
| 5 wickets in innings | – |
| 10 wickets in match | – |
| Best bowling | – |
| Catches/stumpings | 1/– |
- Source: Cricinfo, 19 September 2019

William Henry Garforth (14 January 1855 – 15 June 1931) was an English first-class cricketer and British Army officer.

== Early life ==
The son of William Willoughby Garforth, he was born at Otterington in the North Riding of Yorkshire in January 1855. He was educated at Uppingham School.

== Career ==
After leaving Uppingham, he was commissioned as a sub-lieutenant in the Highland Light Infantry in November 1874, with promotion to the rank of lieutenant coming in August 1877, which was antedated to November 1874. He began studying at Jesus College at the University of Cambridge in 1878. He continued his military service alongside his studies, with promotion to the rank of captain coming in September 1879.

He later served in the First World War as a major in the West Yorkshire Regiment, with his son being killed in the war in 1915. He retired from active service in August 1919.

=== Cricket career ===
While studying at Cambridge, Garforth had also established a tobacconist business in his native Yorkshire. He made a single appearance in first-class cricket when he played for I Zingari against the Gentlemen of England in the Scarborough Festival of 1887. Batting twice in the match, he was dismissed without scoring by Evan Nepean in the I Zingari first-innings, while in their second-innings he was dismissed without scoring by the same bowler.

== Personal life ==
Garforth married Hylda Maria Madelaine Willoughby, the daughter of Henry Willoughby, 8th Baron Middleton, in April 1882.

Garforth died at Malton in June 1931.
