= Henry Goodere (courtier) =

English landowner and courtier (1571–1627)

Sir Henry Goodyer
- Born: 1571
- Baptised: 21 August 1571
- Died: 18 March 1627 (aged 55)
- Spouse: Frances Goodyer (m. 1593; died 1606)
- Issue: 5 (1 son, 4 daughters)
- Father: Sir William Goodyer
- Mother: Mary Wren

Sir Henry Goodyer, also spelled Goodere and Goodier (bapt. 21 August 1571 – 18 March 1627), was an English landowner and courtier, remembered today mainly for his close friendship with John Donne.

== Family ==
Henry was the eldest son of Sir William Goodyer, Knt., of Monks Kirby, Warwickshire, who was knighted by James I in 1603. His grandfather, Francis Goodyer (died 1547), had obtained an estate at Polesworth, in the Forest of Arden, Warwickshire, upon the dissolution of the abbey there in 1538. The eldest son of this Francis Goodyer, Sir Henry Goodyer (1534 – 1595), was compromised in the Duke of Norfolk's intrigue on behalf of Mary, Queen of Scots, in the summer of 1571, and was sent to the Tower in September 1571. But beyond the fact that he had once supplied the Duke with a cipher, little could be made out clearly against him, and he was released in 1572. In 1585 he was serving under Leicester in the Low Countries, and appears to have completely recovered his reputation. In September 1586, at the time of the Battle of Zutphen, he was captain of Leicester's guard; he was knighted by the general on 5 October 1586, and in the following year was captain in command of one hundred and fifty men forming one of the "foot bands" sent to the relief of Sluys. In July 1588 his name was down among the colonels appointed to lead the army assembled at Tilbury for the defence of the Queen's person. He was the early friend and patron of Michael Drayton the poet, who was one of the witnesses of his will, (Note: for an abstract of this see Elton's Introduction to Michael Drayton, 1895) and he is said to have helped Drayton at the university. He died at Polesworth on 5 March 1595, leaving by his wife Frances, daughter of Hugh Lowther of Lowther, Westmoreland, two daughters: Frances, the heiress of Polesworth, who married her first cousin, Sir Henry (the subject of this article); and Anne, a coheiress, who married Sir Henry Raynsford, and is reputed to have been the Idea of Drayton.

Henry Goodere (the subject of this article) married Frances Goodere, the daughter of Henry Goodere (died 1595). Their daughter, Lucy Goodere, who had been a member of the household of Lucy Russell, Countess of Bedford, married Francis Nethersole. She waited on the body of Anne of Denmark at Hampton Court in March 1619.

== Life ==
Henry Goodyer succeeded to the Polesworth estate in 1595, but it is uncertain if he be the Henry Goodyer who was elected to the first parliament of James as member for West Looe in Cornwall. A Henry Goodyer (whom Gosse would appear to identify with Donne's friend) was knighted by James at Lamer, the seat of Sir John Gerrard at Wheathampstead, in June 1608; but this was probably his cousin. If we identify him with the Henry Goodyer who was knighted in Ireland in 1599 (by the Earl of Essex at Dublin on 5 August), we shall have no difficulty in reconciling his known attendance at court in 1604 with the participation by a Sir Henry Goodyer in the festivities of the first year of James I's reign. (Note: see Nichols, Progresses, passim.) He performed in The Masque of Indian and China Knights at Hampton Court on 1 January 1604.

Drayton addressed an ode to Goodyer as "the worthy knight and my noble friend Sir Henry Goodere, a gentleman of his Majesty's Privy Chamber", in which he speaks of having been "gravely merry" by the fire at Polesworth. The owner of Polesworth was indeed famous for his hospitality to literary men. Ben Jonson has an epigram to him in which he alludes to a hawking party at Polesworth. (Note: Epigrams, No. 85.) Inigo Jones was a friend of his, and he had verses in Coryat's Crudities in 1611, and in the third edition of Sylvester's Lachrymæ Lachrymarum in 1613. But he was best known as the closest and most faithful friend to John Donne. Commencing soon after 1600, Donne seems for a long time to have written Goodyer a weekly letter. Several fragments of the correspondence were printed in Letters to several Persons of Honour (1651), and over forty of these letters are printed in Edmund Gosse's Life of Donne, 1899. A verse letter "to Sir Henry Goodyere" was written by Donne during his residence at Mitcham (1606–10). Goodyer constantly needed encouragement, for his finances were in a deplorable state. In December 1604 he wrote a pitiful letter to Cecil at Hatfield, basing a very humble appeal for court favour and pecuniary aid upon his uncle's sufferings in the cause of Mary Queen of Scots, and his own expenses in the service of royalty. What these services were we do not know. In May 1605, however, he was granted by the council a small forfeited estate of 50l. per annum. About the same time, while at court, Goodyer lost from his chamber at Whitehall the sum of 120l. In the same year he was one of the knights at the barrier in connection with Ben Jonson's Masque of Hymen. He was appointed a gentleman of the privy chamber in May 1605, but his decayed estate remained a source of continual perplexity to him.

At the accession of Charles I he insisted more strongly than ever upon his difficulties, under the added stimulus of "misery grown by his expensive service to the late king"; and he prayed earnestly to be admitted a gentleman usher "of the queen's privy chamber, with meat, drink, and lodging, with some dignity, in that place where he had spent most of his time and estate". Death overtook him on 18 March 1627, while still besieging the court with his importunities. His only son, John, of the Middle Temple, who had been "at the barrier" and was presented to the King upon the creation of Prince Charles as Prince of Wales in 1616, predeceased him in December 1624, but he left four daughters, of whom the eldest, Lucy, married Sir Francis Nethersole. The Nethersoles inherited Polesworth, which from them passed to the Biddulphs, the descendants of Sir Henry's youngest daughter, Anne. The following epitaph upon Sir Henry, by an anonymous "affectionate friend", is printed in Camden's Remains:

An ill year of a Goodyere us bereft,
Who gone to God much lack of him here left;
Full of good gifts, of body and of mind,
Wise, comely, learned, eloquent and kind.

Goodyer may be the "H. G." who has verses in Drayton's Matilda (1594), and to whom Drayton's Odes were dedicated in 1606. He wrote verses now and again in emulation of his intimate friend (as Walton calls him), Dr. Donne. He was doubtless the "Sir H. G." who wrote a verse letter with Donne alternis vicibus, and he may have been the author of the poem, "Shall I like a Hermit dwell", (Note: Hannah, Court Poets, p. 82) which has often been ascribed to Ralegh. An undoubted poem of his is in Add MS 25707 (ff. 36–9), and there are some others in The National Archives, including an epithalamium on Buckingham's marriage, verses on Prince Charles, his journey to Spain, and other courtly topics.

== Sources ==
- Cass's Parish of Monken Hadley, 1880 (with the Goodyer pedigree);
- Nichols's Progresses of James I, vols. i. ii. and iii.;
- Metcalfe's Book of Knights;
- Visitation of Warwickshire, 1619, Harleian Society Publications xii. 67;
- Gentleman's Magazine 1825, ii. 136;
- Elton's Introduction to Michael Drayton, Manchester, 1895;
- Poems of J. Donne, ed. Chambers, ii. 216;
- Digby's Poems (Roxburghe Club), ed. G. F. Warner;
- Markham's Fighting Veres, p. 97;
- Calendar of State Papers, Domestic: 1603–10, pp. 213, 221, 334, 592, 1610–18, p. 72, 1619–23, pp. 193, 378, 472, 513, 585, 1623–5, pp. 105, 147, 217, 427, 514, 556, 1625–6, p. 403;
- Harley MS 757, f. 145;
- Add MSS 5482, ff. 17 & 18; 25767, f. 37;
- Calendar of Hatfield MSS. (Hist. MSS. Comm.), vol. vii.;
- Grosart's Life of Donne, ii. 25;
- Gosse's Life and Letters of John Donne, 1899, passim.

== See also ==
- Henry Goodere (died 1595)
- Goodere

== Bibliography ==
- Considine, John (2008). "Goodere, Sir Henry (bap. 1571, d. 1627), landowner and courtier". In Oxford Dictionary of National Biography. Oxford University Press.
- Hunneyball, Paul (2010). "Goodyer, Sir Henry (?1571-1627), of Polesworth, Warws.". In Andrew Thrush and John P. Ferris (eds.). The History of Parliament: the House of Commons 1604-1629. Cambridge University Press.
- Seccombe, Thomas (1901). "Goodyer, Henry (1571-1627)" . In Lee, Sidney (ed.). Dictionary of National Biography (1st supplement). Vol. 2. London: Smith, Elder & Co. pp. 330–332.
