= Thomas Willoughby (MP) =

English landowner and Tory politician

Thomas Willoughby (11 June 1694 – 2 December 1742) was an English landowner and Tory politician who sat in the House of Commons from 1720 to 1734.

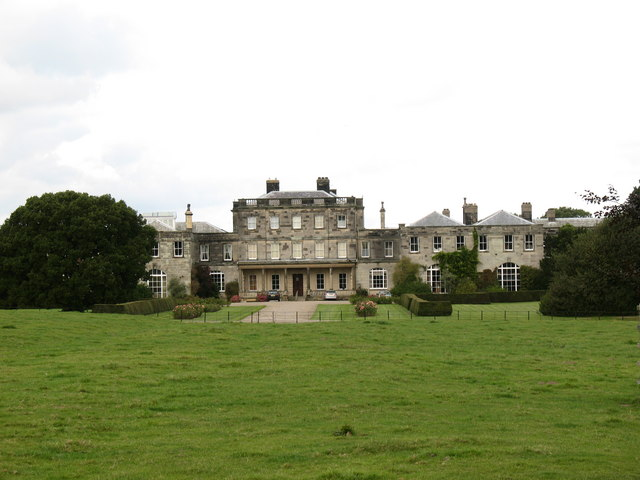
Birdsall House

Willoughby was the second son of Thomas Willoughby, 1st Baron Middleton and his wife Elizabeth Rothwell, daughter of Sir Richard Rothwell, 1st Baronet, MP. He was educated at Eton College and was admitted at Jesus College, Cambridge on 1 November 1711. He matriculated there in 1712 and was awarded MA in 1720. In 1719, he married Elizabeth Sotheby, the daughter and heiress of Thomas Sotheby of Birdsall of Birdsall, North Yorkshire. Through his marriage, he inherited Birdsall House

Willoughby was elected Tory Member of Parliament for Cambridge University at a by-election on 19 December 1720. He was returned unopposed again for the university at the 1722 general election. At the 1727 general election, Willoughby stood for Parliament at Tamworth on his father's interest and was elected MP. There is little record of his activities in Parliament and he did not stand in 1734.

Willoughby died on 2 December 1742 and his wife ten years later on 25 April 1752. They had seven children:

- Henry Willoughby, 5th Baron Middleton (1726–1800)
- Francis Willoughby (b. 1727), of Hesley Hall, married on 25 May 1762 Octavia Fisher and had issue
- Rev. James Willoughby (1731–1816), rector of Guiseley, married Eleanor Hobson and had issue
- Cassandra Willoughby
- Elizabeth Willoughby, married in 1750 Rev. Edmund Garforth
- Emma Willoughby (d. 1781), married Rev. N. Hodgson
- Antonina Willoughby, married in 1765 Rev. Henry Hewgill

Birdsall House became the chief residence of the Barons Middleton in 1923.

Parliament of Great Britain
Preceded by Dixie Windsor; Thomas Paske	Member of Parliament for Cambridge University; 1720–1727; With: Dixie Windsor	Succeeded by Edward Finch; Thomas Townshend
Preceded by Francis Willoughby; George Compton	Member of Parliament for Tamworth; 1727–1734; With: The Earl of Inchiquin	Succeeded by Lord John Sackville; George Compton
