= Thomas Willoughby, 1st Baron Middleton =

British politician

Thomas Willoughby, 1st Baron Middleton (9 April 1672 – 2 April 1729), was a Tory politician who sat in the English and British House of Commons between 1698 and 1711 when he was raised to the peerage as Baron Middleton as one of Harley's Dozen.

== Early life ==
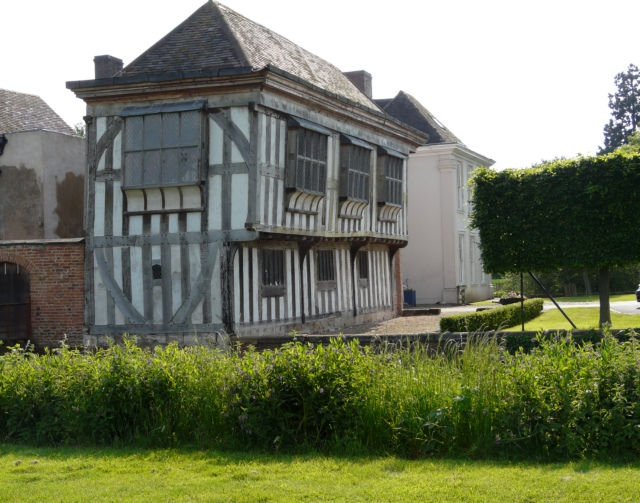
Old part of Middleton Hall

Willoughby was born at Middleton Hall, Middleton, Warwickshire, the second son of Francis Willughby and his wife Emma Barnard, daughter of Sir Henry Barnard, merchant, of London and Bridgnorth, Shropshire. His father, who preferred to use this aberrant spelling of the family name, was a mathematician and naturalist but died shortly after his son's birth.

In August 1676, Willoughby's mother married Sir Josiah Child, 1st Baronet, MP, and the family moved to Wanstead in Essex. His elder brother, Francis, decided Willoughby should go to Cambridge and he was admitted at St Catharine's College, Cambridge on 10 July 1683. He subsequently transferred to Jesus College, Cambridge on 4 May 1685, where he was under the tutorship of Dr Man. In 1688 on the early death of his brother, Francis, he succeeded to the baronetcy, and inherited the estates at Middleton, Warwickshire and at Wollaton Hall, Nottinghamshire.

Willoughby was living in London in the winter of 1688 to 1689, where he contracted smallpox. On recovery, he decided to live at Wollaton Hall and continued there his studies under Dr Man. He was added to the Nottinghamshire commission of the peace in April 1689. In 1690 the Earl of Danby, warden of Sherwood Forest, appointed him to the post of Chief forester and keeper of the walk of Langton Arbor, Sherwood Forest. On 9 April 1691, he married Elizabeth Rothwell, daughter of Sir Richard Rothwell, 1st Baronet. In 1692 he became Deputy Lieutenant of Nottinghamshire. He was elected a Fellow of the Royal Society on 30 November 1693.

== Career ==
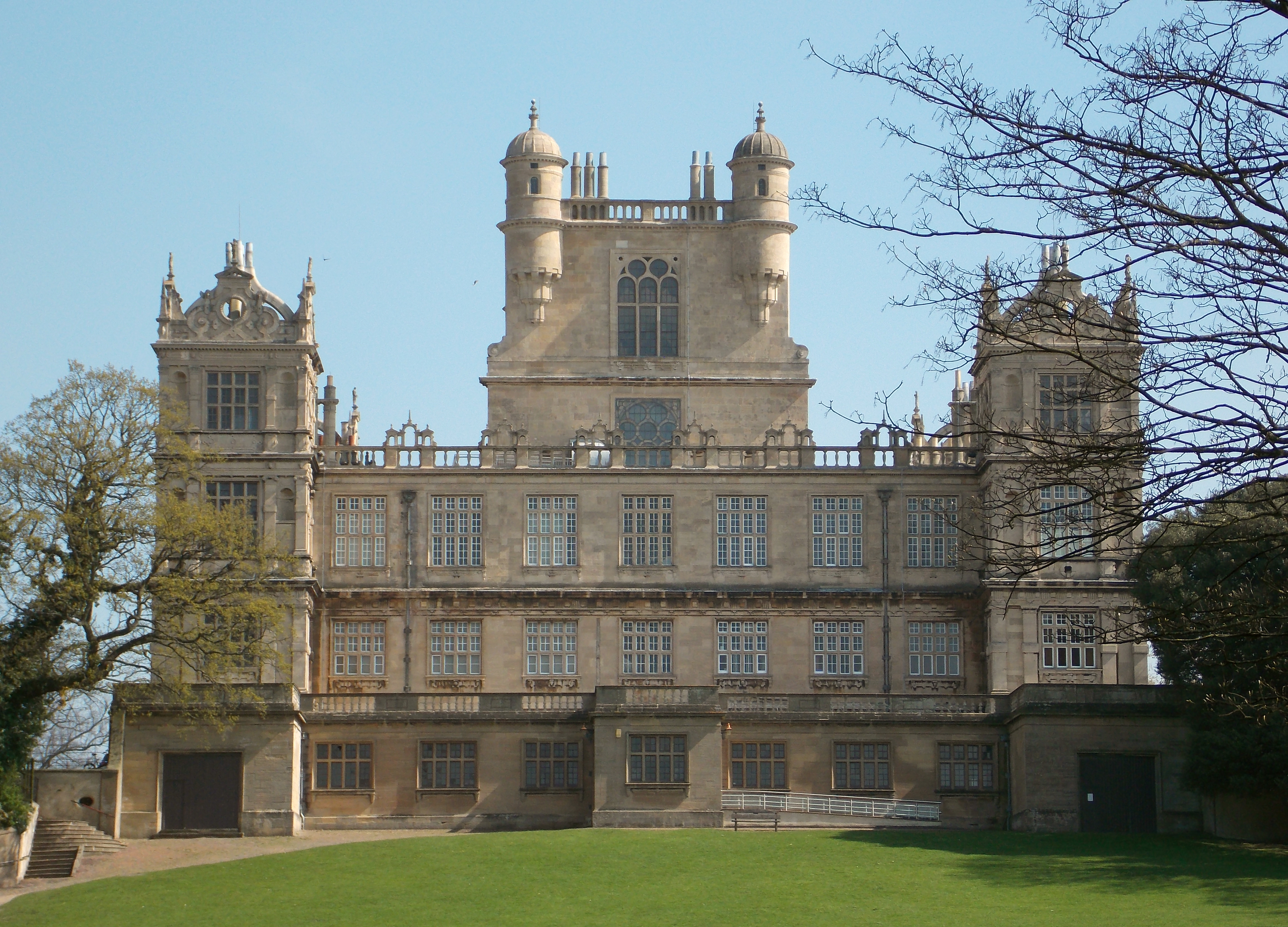
Wollaton Hall

Willoughby became a person of great influence, and in 1695 was High Sheriff of Nottinghamshire. At the 1698 English general election, he stood with Gervase Eyre at Nottinghamshire to turn out the sitting members, and was returned as Member of Parliament by a large margin. He extended his influence to Lincolnshire in 1699 when he was High Sheriff of Lincolnshire and appointed Deputy Lieutenant. He was returned again for Nottinghamshire at the two general elections of 1701. At the 1702 English general election he refused to stand for parliament, but received several hundred votes nevertheless. He was returned unopposed as Tory MP for Nottinghamshire at the 1705 English general election through an electoral pact with the Whig John Thornhagh. He was absent from the vote on the new speaker, and hardly left his mark in the Parliament, although he was named to draft a bill concerning the Trent navigation on 20 November 1705. He had been petitioning Queen Anne for the title of High steward, and the profits of, the honor of Peveril, Nottinghamshire and Derbyshire which included valuable coal mines and stone quarries, and eventually in 1706, he was awarded the title, but not the profits. The electoral pact held and he was returned again unopposed at the 1708 British general election. For much of the parliament, both MPs were caught up in a dispute with the Duke of Newcastle over depredations of royal deer in Sherwood Forest.

At the 1710 British general election, Willoughby virtually handed over his seat at Nottinghamshire to William Levinz, and was returned as Tory MP for Newark. He was listed as a 'worthy patriot' who had detected the mismanagements of the previous ministry. He was not listed as a member of the October Club, but eventually became a member of the drinking club 'Board of Brothers'. In 1711, when the post of Warden of Sherwood Forest became vacant, Willoughby applied to Robert Harley, but Harley took the post for himself. However Harley raised Willoughby to the Peerage as Baron Middleton in on 1 January 1712 to increase Tory support in the House of Lords, and Willoughby vacated his seat in the House of Commons.

Middleton continued to be at the centre of Tory politics in Nottinghamshire and was an effective political agent. He supported the election of his eldest son in 1713. In 1714, he was appointed High Steward of the Royal Town of Sutton Coldfield. In 1728 he was listed as one of the subscribers to the Cyclopaedia of Ephraim Chambers.

== Death and legacy ==
Middleton died on 7 April 1729 and was buried at Middleton. He left two sons:

- Francis Willoughby, 2nd Baron Middleton (1692–1758)
- The Hon Thomas Willoughby (11 June 1694 – 2 December 1742), married Elizabeth Southby and had issue
- The Hon Rothwell Willoughby (1696 - 15 April 1752)

His widow died in 1736.

Parliament of England
Preceded by Sir Scrope Howe; John White	Member of Parliament for Nottinghamshire; 1698–1702; With: Gervase Eyre 1698–1701; Sir Francis Molyneux, Bt 1701–1702	Succeeded by Sir Francis Molyneux, Bt; Gervase Eyre
Parliament of Great Britain
Preceded by Sir Francis Molyneux, Bt; John Thornhagh	Member of Parliament for Nottinghamshire; 1705–1710; With: John Thornhagh	Succeeded by Sir Scrope Howe; William Levinz
Preceded by James Saunderson; Richard Sutton	Member of Parliament for Newark; 1710–1711; With: Richard Newdigate	Succeeded by Richard Newdigate; Richard Sutton
Honorary titles
Preceded by The Viscount Weymouth	High Steward of Sutton Coldfield; 1714–1729	Succeeded by The Lord Middleton
Peerage of Great Britain
New creation	Baron Middleton; 1711–1729	Succeeded by Francis Willoughby
Baronetage of England
Preceded by Francis Willoughby	Baronet (of Wollaton); 1688–1729	Succeeded by Francis Willoughby
