= Francis Willoughby, 2nd Baron Middleton =

British politician

Francis Willoughby, 2nd Baron Middleton (4 October 1692 – 31 July 1758), was a British politician who sat in the House of Commons from 1713 to 1727. He succeeded to a barony in the Peerage of Great Britain.

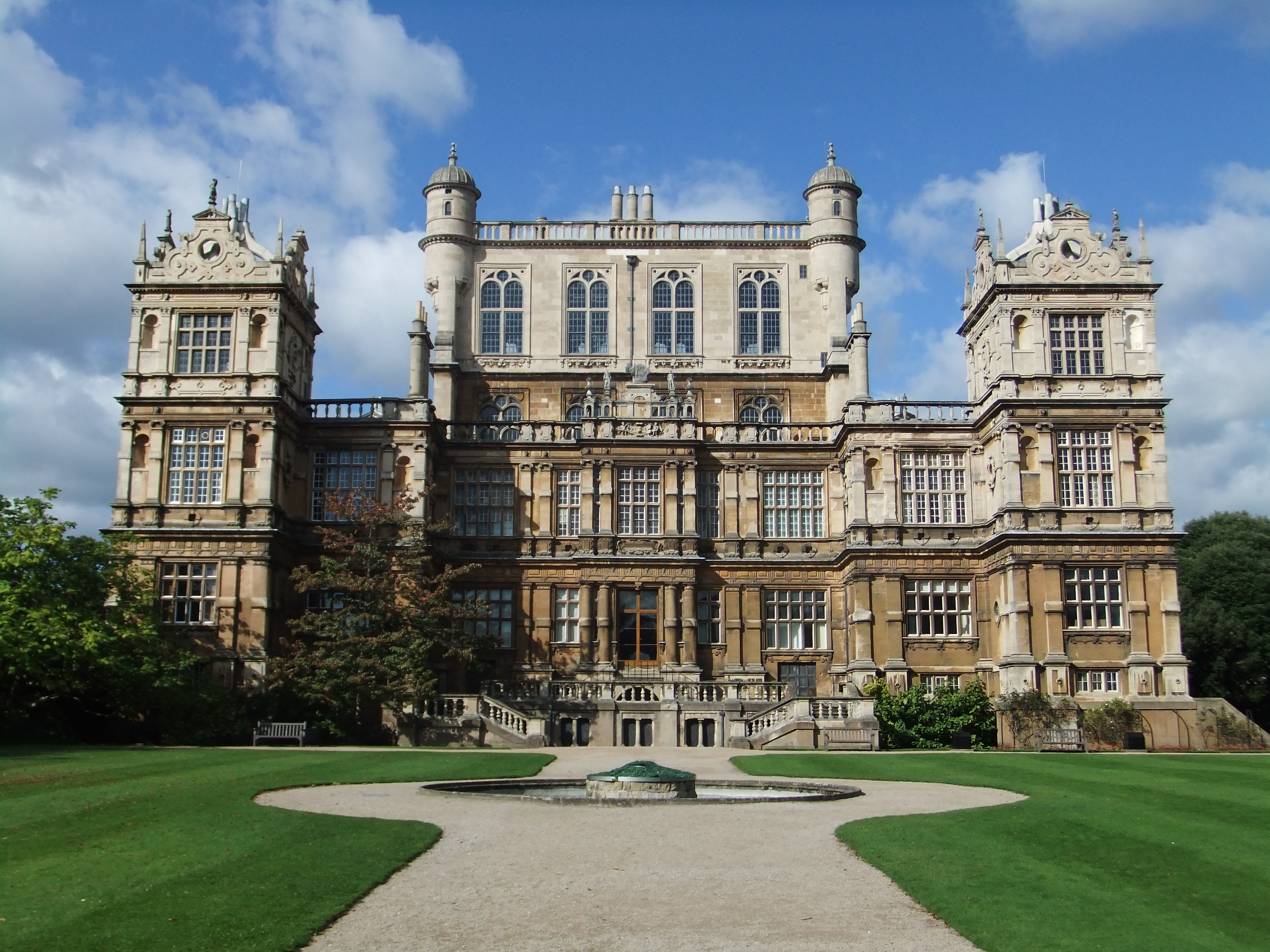
Wollaton Hall, Nottingham

He was born the eldest son of Thomas Willoughby, 1st Baron Middleton, and Elizabeth, the daughter and coheiress of Sir Richard Rothwell, 1st Bt. He was the brother of Hon. Thomas Willoughby, MP.

He was educated at Eton and at Jesus College, Cambridge, graduating MA in 1712.

He was returned as Member of Parliament for Nottinghamshire at the general elections of 1713 and 1715. At the 1722 general election he was returned as MP for Tamworth until 1727.

He succeeded to the barony on his father's death in 1729, and inherited estates at Wollaton Hall, Nottinghamshire (where he lived), and at Middleton Hall, Middleton, Warwickshire.

He was High Steward of the Royal Town of Sutton Coldfield from 1729.

He married Mary Edwards in 1723 by whom he had two sons, who succeeded in turn to the barony, and a daughter:

- Francis Willoughby, 3rd Baron Middleton (1726–1774)
- Thomas Willoughby, 4th Baron Middleton (1728–1781)
- daughter, name unknown

Parliament of Great Britain
Preceded by The Viscount Howe; William Levinz	Member of Parliament for Nottinghamshire; 1713–1722; With: William Levinz	Succeeded by Sir Robert Sutton; The Viscount Howe
Preceded by Samuel Bracebridge; William Inge	Member of Parliament for Tamworth; 1722–1727; With: Samuel Bracebridge 1722–1723; Richard Swinfen 1723–1727; George Compton 1727	Succeeded by The Earl of Inchiquin; Thomas Willoughby
Honorary titles
Preceded by The 1st Lord Middleton	High Steward of Sutton Coldfield; 1729–1758	Succeeded by The 3rd Lord Middleton
Peerage of Great Britain
Preceded by Thomas Willoughby	Baron Middleton; 1729–1758	Succeeded by Francis Willoughby
