= Aldro, North Yorkshire =

Hamlet in the North Riding of Yorkshire, England

Coordinates: 54.056°N 0.765°W

Aldro
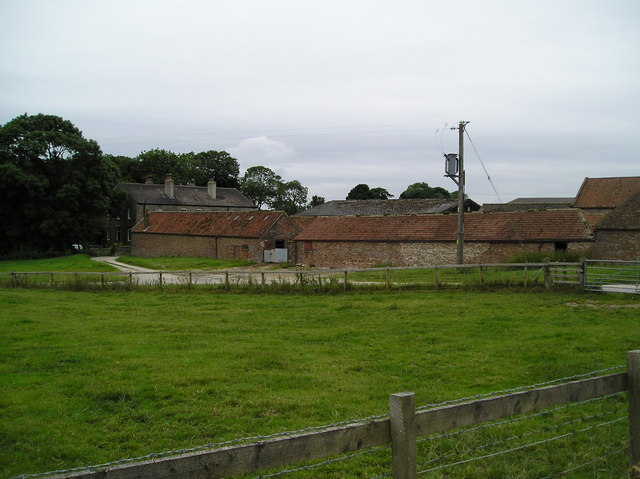
- Aldro Farm

- Location within North Yorkshire
- OS grid reference: SE807436
  - London: 178 mi (286 km) S
- Civil parish: l
- Unitary authority: North Yorkshire
- Ceremonial county: North Yorkshire
- Region: Yorkshire and the Humber
- Country: England
- Sovereign state: United Kingdom
- Post town: MALTON
- Postcode district: YO17
- Dialling code: 01759
- Police: North Yorkshire
- Fire: North Yorkshire
- Ambulance: Yorkshire
- UK Parliament: Thirsk and Malton

Aldro is a hamlet in North Yorkshire, England. It lies south of Malton, and Birdsall directly east of the villages of Leavening and Acklam.

The Aldro Farm Barn and Implement Shed, dating to the early 19th-century was grade II in 11 February 1987.
