= Birdsall House =

Country house in North Yorkshire, England

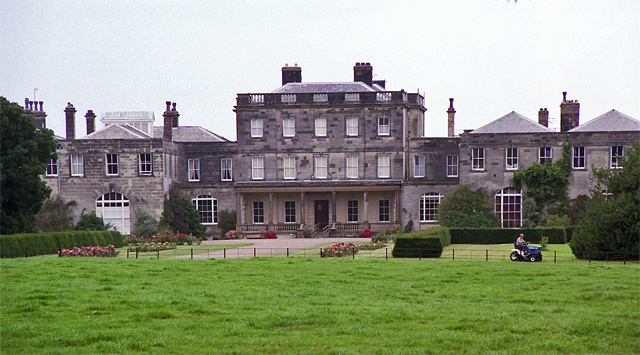
- Interactive map of the Birdsall House area

General information
- Type: Country House
- Location: Birdsall, North Yorkshire
- Coordinates: 54.07307°N 0.755891°W
- Completed: 1872

Design and construction
- Designations: Grade II* listed

Birdsall House is an English country house in Birdsall, North Yorkshire. It is a Grade II* listed building.

The house dates from the late 16th century but was remodelled in 1749 with addition of second storey (third floor) to the main range. A wing was added in 1776 and a matching right wing added in 1872.

It is constructed in ashlar with Welsh slate roofs. The central range is a 3-storey, 5-bay building connected to outlying 2-storey 2-bay side wings by single cell units. The house was the first house in England to benefit from a private gas system.

== History ==
The site of the house and its parkland was a monastery estate prior to the Dissolution of the Monasteries by Henry VIII and the original Tudor house was built for the Sotheby family. After Elizabeth Sotherby married Thomas Willoughby the couple converted the house into the larger Georgian style house of today. The estate duly passed into the ownership of the Willoughby family, passing first to Thomas' son Henry, who afterwards inherited from his cousin the title of 5th Baron Middleton, together with other estates at Middleton and Wollaton Park, where he actually chose to live.

The 8th Baron Middleton, however, chose to live at Birdsall, employing the architect Anthony Salvin to extend the house and eventually dying there in 1877. His son, the 9th Baron likewise preferred Birdsall and likewise died there in 1922. In 1923 the family sold the Middleton and Wollaton estates and thus made Birdsall the sole family seat, which it has remained ever since. James and Cara Willoughby and their family still live and work at Birdsall, using parts of the house and grounds as a luxury wedding and event venue. In 2024, the family completed a renovation of the old Victorian Kitchens into an exclusive event venue.

== See also ==
- Grade II* listed buildings in North Yorkshire (district)
- Listed buildings in Birdsall, North Yorkshire
