= 1694 =

1694 in various calendars
- Gregorian calendar: 1694; MDCXCIV
- Ab urbe condita: 2447
- Armenian calendar: 1143; ԹՎ ՌՃԽԳ
- Assyrian calendar: 6444
- Balinese saka calendar: 1615–1616
- Bengali calendar: 1100–1101
- Berber calendar: 2644
- English Regnal year: 6 Will. & Mar. – 7 Will. & Mar.
- Buddhist calendar: 2238
- Burmese calendar: 1056
- Byzantine calendar: 7202–7203
- Chinese calendar: 癸酉年 (Water Rooster); 4391 or 4184 — to — 甲戌年 (Wood Dog); 4392 or 4185
- Coptic calendar: 1410–1411
- Discordian calendar: 2860
- Ethiopian calendar: 1686–1687
- Hebrew calendar: 5454–5455
- Hindu calendars
- Vikram Samvat: 1750–1751
- Shaka Samvat: 1615–1616
- Kali Yuga: 4794–4795
- Holocene calendar: 11694
- Igbo calendar: 694–695
- Iranian calendar: 1072–1073
- Islamic calendar: 1105–1106
- Japanese calendar: Genroku 7 (元禄７年)
- Javanese calendar: 1617–1618
- Julian calendar: Gregorian minus 10 days
- Korean calendar: 4027
- Minguo calendar: 218 before ROC 民前218年
- Nanakshahi calendar: 226
- Thai solar calendar: 2236–2237
- Tibetan calendar: ཆུ་མོ་བྱ་ལོ་ (female Water-Bird); 1820 or 1439 or 667 — to — ཤིང་ཕོ་ཁྱི་ལོ་ (male Wood-Dog); 1821 or 1440 or 668

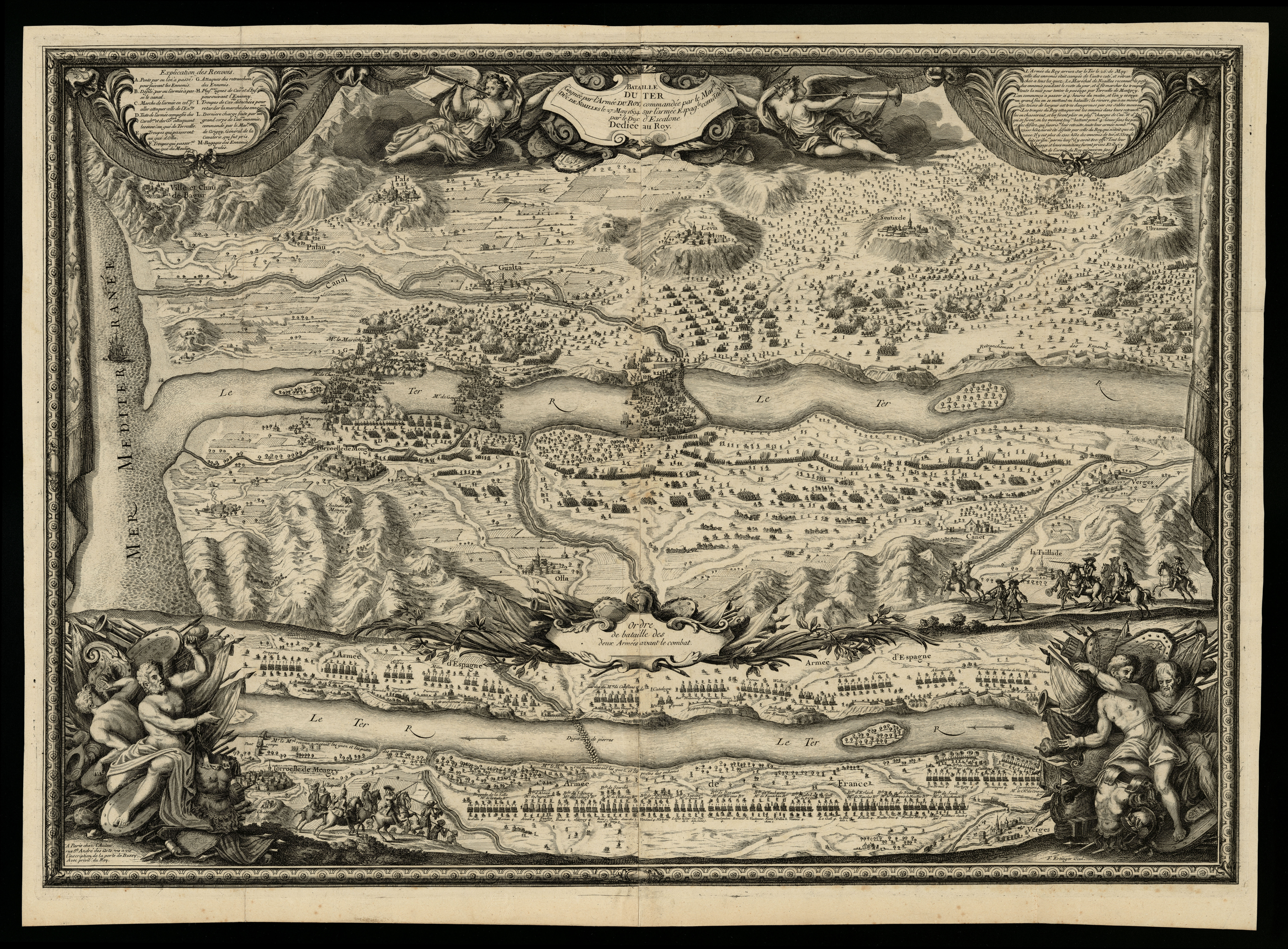
May 27: The French Army devastates Spanish troops at the Battle of Torroella after taking advantage of a fog.

1694 (MDCXCIV) was a common year starting on Friday of the Gregorian calendar and a common year starting on Monday of the Julian calendar, the 1694th year of the Common Era (CE) and Anno Domini (AD) designations, the 694th year of the 2nd millennium, the 94th year of the 17th century, and the 5th year of the 1690s decade. As of the start of 1694, the Gregorian calendar was 10 days ahead of the Julian calendar, which remained in localized use until 1923.

== Events ==
=== January–March ===
- January 16 – Francesco Morosini, the Doge of Venice since 1688, dies after ruling the Republic for more than five years and a few months after an unsuccessful attempt to capture the island of Negropont from the Ottoman Empire during the Morean War.
- January 18 – Sir James Montgomery of Scotland, who had been arrested on January 11 for conspiracy to restore King James to the throne, escapes and flees to France.
- January 21 (January 11 O.S.) – The Kiev Academy, predecessor of the national university of Ukraine, receives official recognition by Tsar Ivan V of Russia.
- January 28 – Pirro e Demetrio, an opera by Alessandro Scarlatti, is given its first performance, debuting at the Teatro San Bartolomeo in Naples. The opera is adapted in 1708 in London as Pyrrhus and Demetrius and becomes the second most popular opera in 18th century London.
- January 29 – French missionary Jean-Baptiste Labat arrives in the New World, landing at the Caribbean island of Martinique.
- February 5 – The ship Ridderschap van Holland is lost at sea, having departed the Cape of Good Hope with a crew of 300, with a destination of Batavia (modern-day Jakarta in Indonesia), normally a voyage of two months. It never arrives and is never seen again.
- February 6 – The colony of Quilombo dos Palmares, created by rebel African slaves in Brazil, is destroyed by the bandeirantes, colonial troops under the command of Domingos Jorge Velho. After a successful attack on its capital, Cerca do Macaco, the last King of Dos Palmares, Zumbi, flees after a reign of more than 13 years, but is later captured and executed.
- February 26 – Silvestro Valier is elected as the new Doge of Venice to replace the late Francesco Morosini
- March 1 – British flagship HMS Sussex (1693) (carrying gold coin) and twelve other ships are wrecked in a storm in the Mediterranean off Gibraltar with the loss of approximately 1,200 lives.
- March 8 – The Casa da Moeda do Brasil is formed by Peter II of Portugal.

=== April–June ===
- April 2 – Sheikh Yusuf, exiled by the administrators of the Dutch East Indies (modern-day Indonesia), arrives at the Dutch Cape Colony on the ship De Voetboog, at what later becomes Cape Town, South Africa, along with two wives, two concubines and twelve children. Resettled by the colonial government at a farm in Zandvliet, the Sheikh introduces Islam to South Africa.
- April 7 – The British Royal Navy's 40-gun warship HMS Ruby captures the French privateer Entreprenant in battle. The confiscated ship is renamed HMS Ruby Prize.
- April 12 – The French ship Diligente, commanded by René Duguay-Trouin, covers the escape of a convoy of ships that he is escorting, but then is surrounded and attacked by six Royal Navy ships led by David Mitchell. Most of the Diligente crew is lost in the battle, and Duguay-Trouin is captured.
- April 13 – The largest volcanic eruption of Mount Vesuvius since 1631 takes place, with lava flows towards both San Giorgio a Cremano and Torre del Greco, after explosions in the crater that began April 5. Around April 20, ash falls are experienced as far away as Calabria.
- April 27 – Frederick Augustus of Wettin, later known as "Augustus the Strong" and the future King of Poland, becomes the new Elector of Saxony upon the death of his 25-year-old older brother, John George IV
- May 27 – Taking advantage of a fog, the French Army, with 24,000 troops, fights the Battle of Torroella against an equally large Spanish Army force on the banks of the Ter in Spain, near the city of Girona during the Nine Years' War. The Spaniards suffer 3,000 casualties, while the French sustain 500.
- June 22 – An annular solar eclipse is visible across North America and the Atlantic Ocean.
- June 24 – The Tunisian–Algerian War begins as Algerian troops cross into Tunisia.
- June 29 – The Battle of Texel is fought near the Dutch island of Texel, one of the West Frisian Islands. The French Navy force of 8 ships, commanded by Jean Bart, locates and rescues three French ships that had been captured by the Dutch Republic in late May. Bart fights a larger force commanded by Hidde Sjoerds de Vries, who dies of his wounds after being captured.

=== July–September ===
- July 27 – The Bank of England is founded through Royal charter by the Whig-dominated Parliament of England, following a proposal by Scottish merchant William Paterson to raise capital, by offering safe and steady returns of interest guaranteed by future taxes. A total of £1.2 million is raised for the war effort against Louis XIV of France by the end of the year, to establish the first-ever government debt.
- August 6 – The coronation of Sultan Husayn of the Safavid dynasty as the Shah of Persia takes place in Isfahan, eight days after the death of his father Suleiman I.
- August 24 – The Dictionnaire de l'Académie française, the first official dictionary of the French language, is presented by Jacques de Tourreil and Academy members on behalf of the Académie française to King Louis XIV.
- September 5 – The Great Fire of Warwick breaks out in England and destroys half the town. Donors raise £110,000 toward disaster relief, with Queen Anne contributing £1,000.
- September 8 – The 1694 Irpinia–Basilicata earthquake causes widespread severe damage and over 6,000 deaths in the Kingdom of Naples.
- September 27 – A hurricane hits Carlisle Bay, Barbados, sinking 27 British ships and resulting in 3,000 casualties.

=== October–December ===
- October 19 – A major windstorm begins and continues for several days, spreading the Culbin Sands over a large area of farmland in the Scottish Highlands in the County of Moray and burying the now-abandoned village of Culbin.
- October 23 – British/American colonial forces, led by Sir William Phips, fail to seize Quebec from the French.
- October 25 – Queen Mary II of England founds the Royal Hospital for Seamen at Greenwich.
- November 12 – The Army of Algeria captures Tunis, the capital of Tunisia, after a siege of three months, bringing an end to the Tunisian–Algerian War. Mohamed Bey El Mouradi, the Bey of Tunis, flees southward while Prince Muhammad ben Cheker of Tunisia becomes the new Dey on behalf of the Dey of Algiers, Hadj Ahmed.
- December 3 – The Parliament of England passes the Triennial Act 1694, requiring general elections every three years.
- December 6 – Thomas Tenison is appointed Archbishop of Canterbury.
- December 16 – A total solar eclipse is visible across South America.

=== Date unknown ===
- The Lao empire of Lan Xang unofficially ends.
- The notorious voyage of the English slave ship Hannibal (part of the Atlantic slave trade out of Benin) ends with the death of nearly half of the 692 slaves aboard.
- Rascians establish the settlement which will become Novi Sad on the Danube.
- The Parker Tavern is built in Reading, Massachusetts.

== Births ==
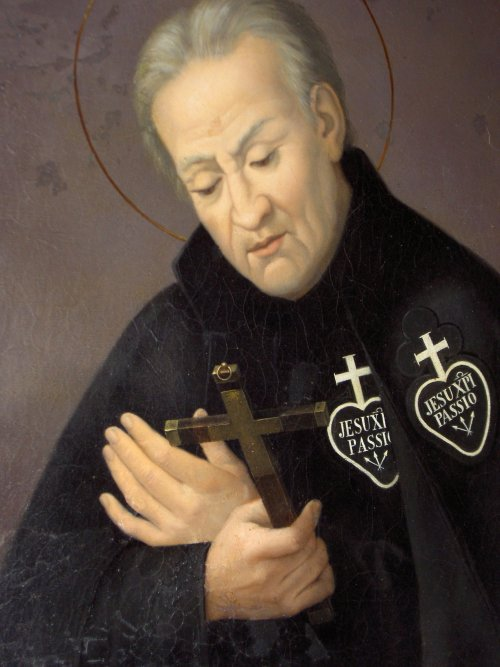
Paul of the Cross born 3 January

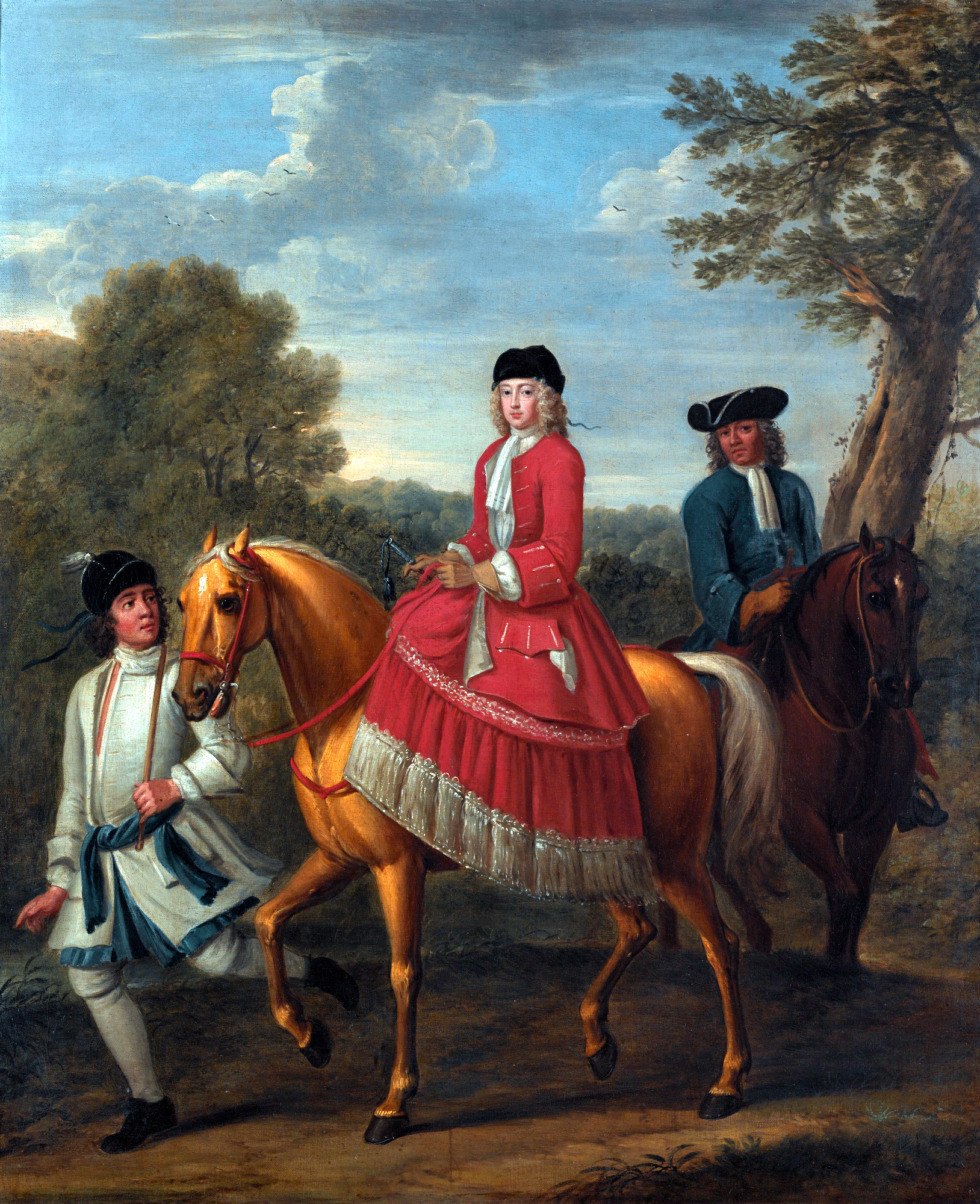
Henrietta Harley, Countess of Oxford and Countess Mortimer born 11 February

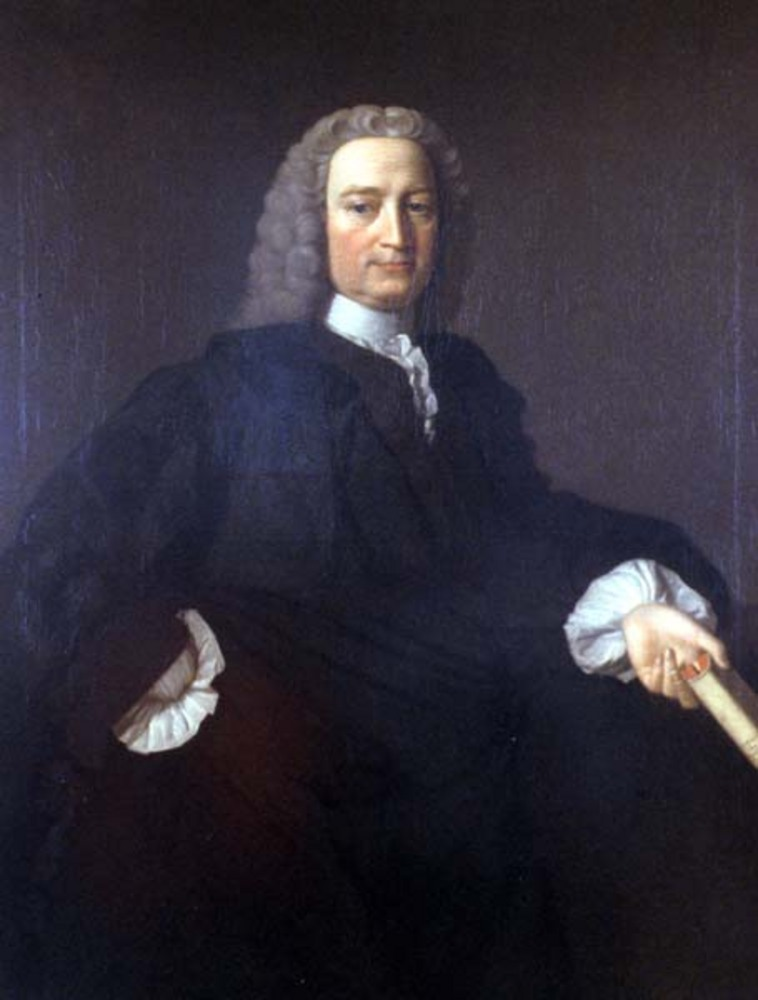
Francis Hutcheson (philosopher) born 8 August

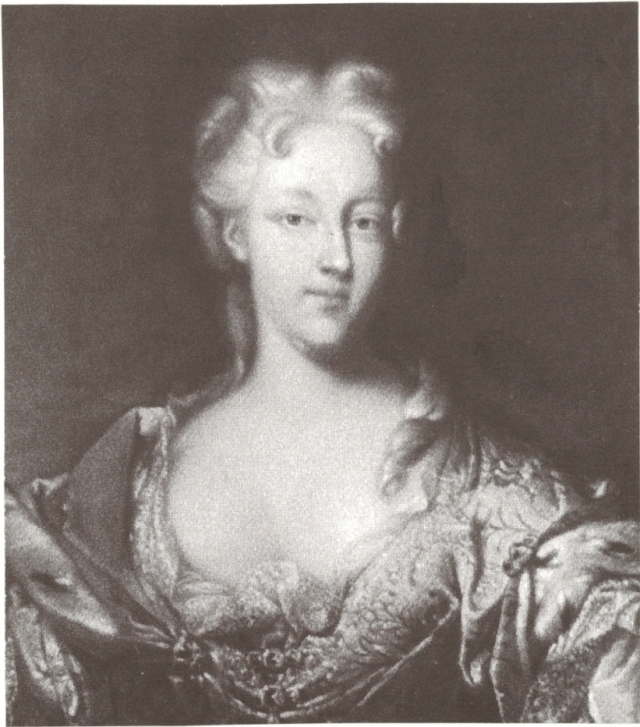
Christiane Charlotte of Württemberg-Winnental born 20 August

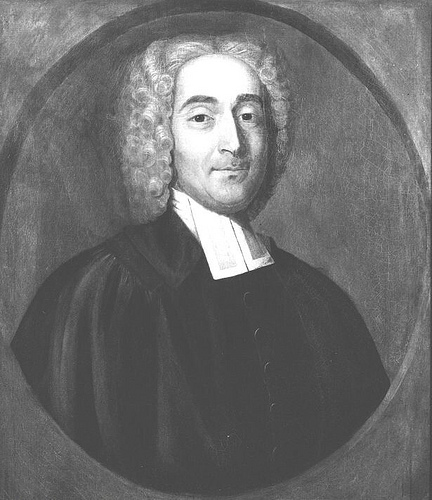
Elisha Williams born 26 August

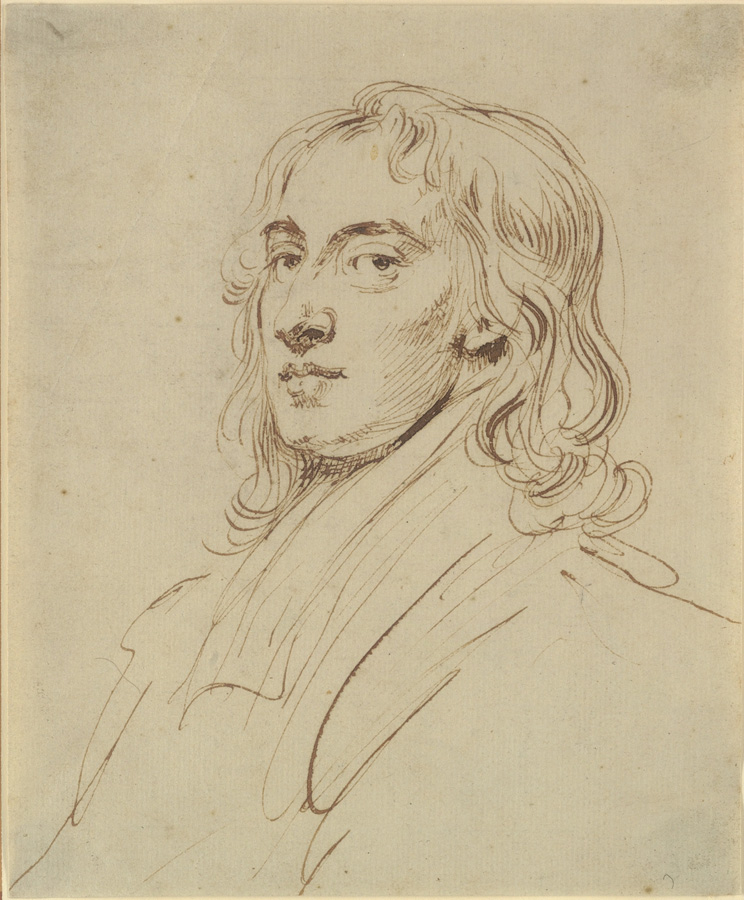
John Vanderbank born 9 September

Yeongjo of Joseon born 13 September

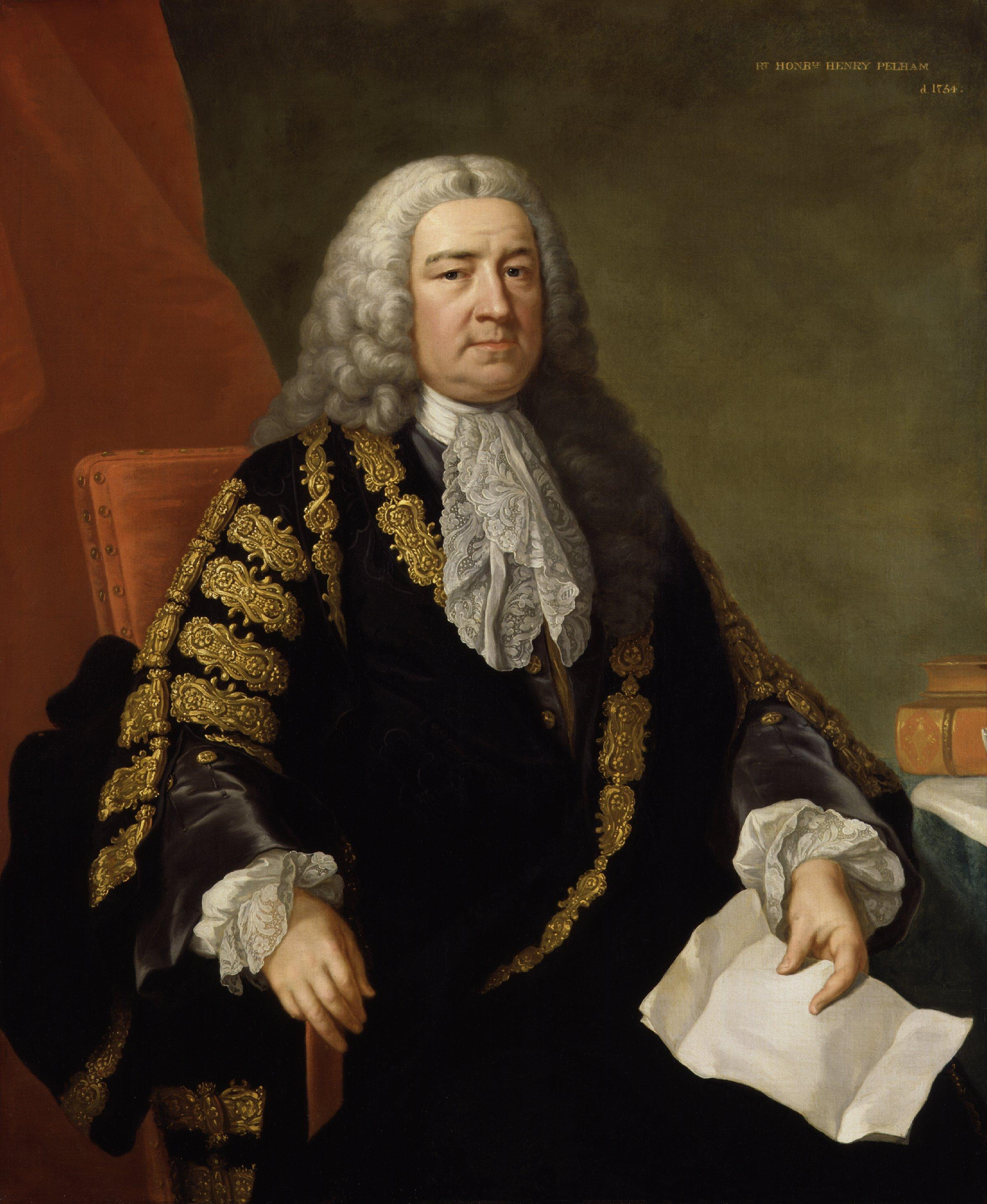
Henry Pelham born 25 September

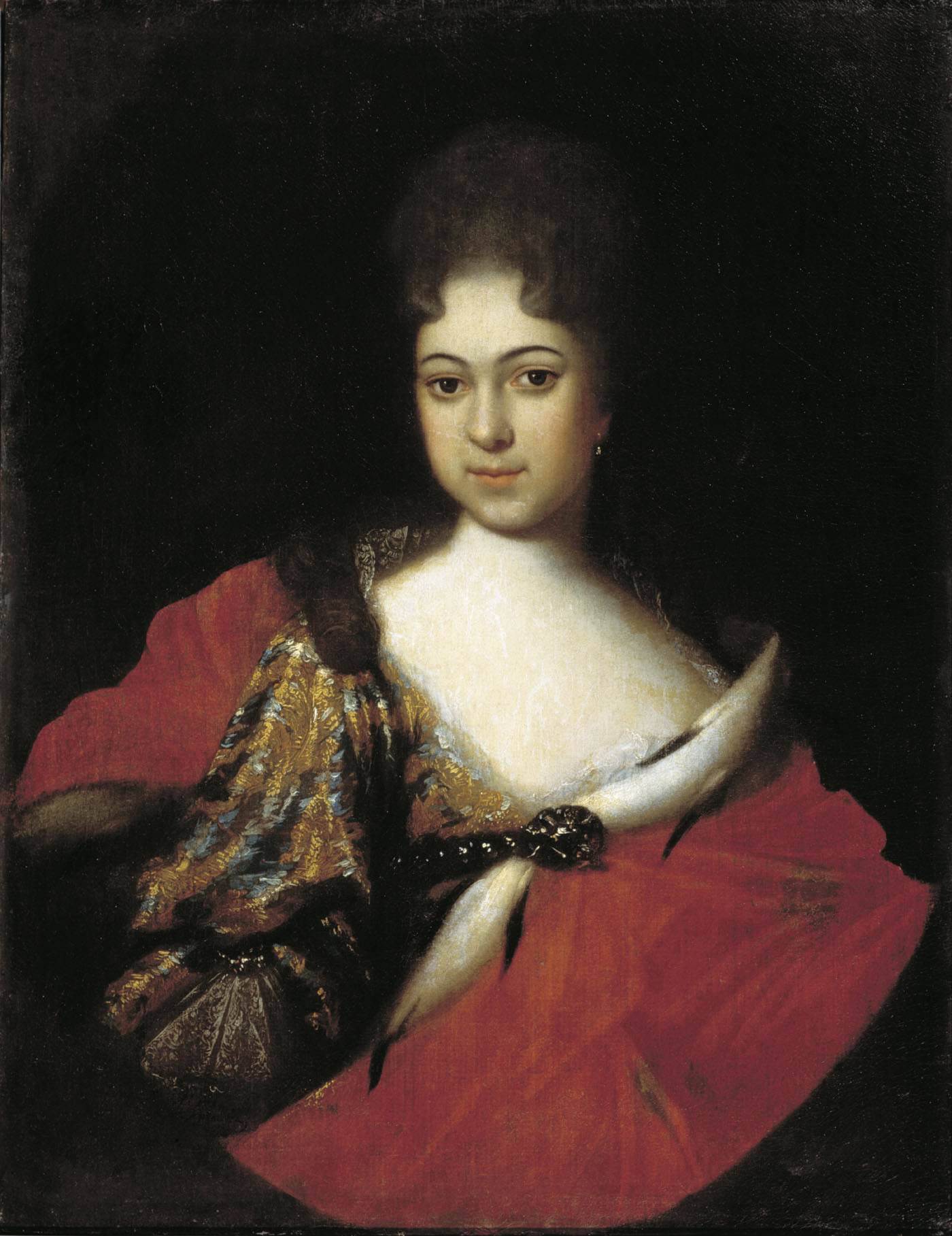
Tsarevna Praskovya Ivanovna of Russia born 4 October

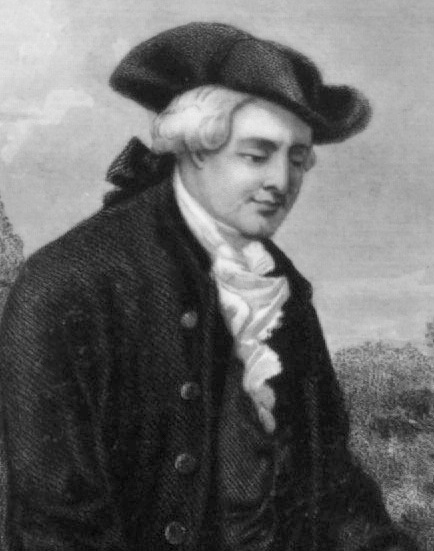
Augustine Washington born 12 November

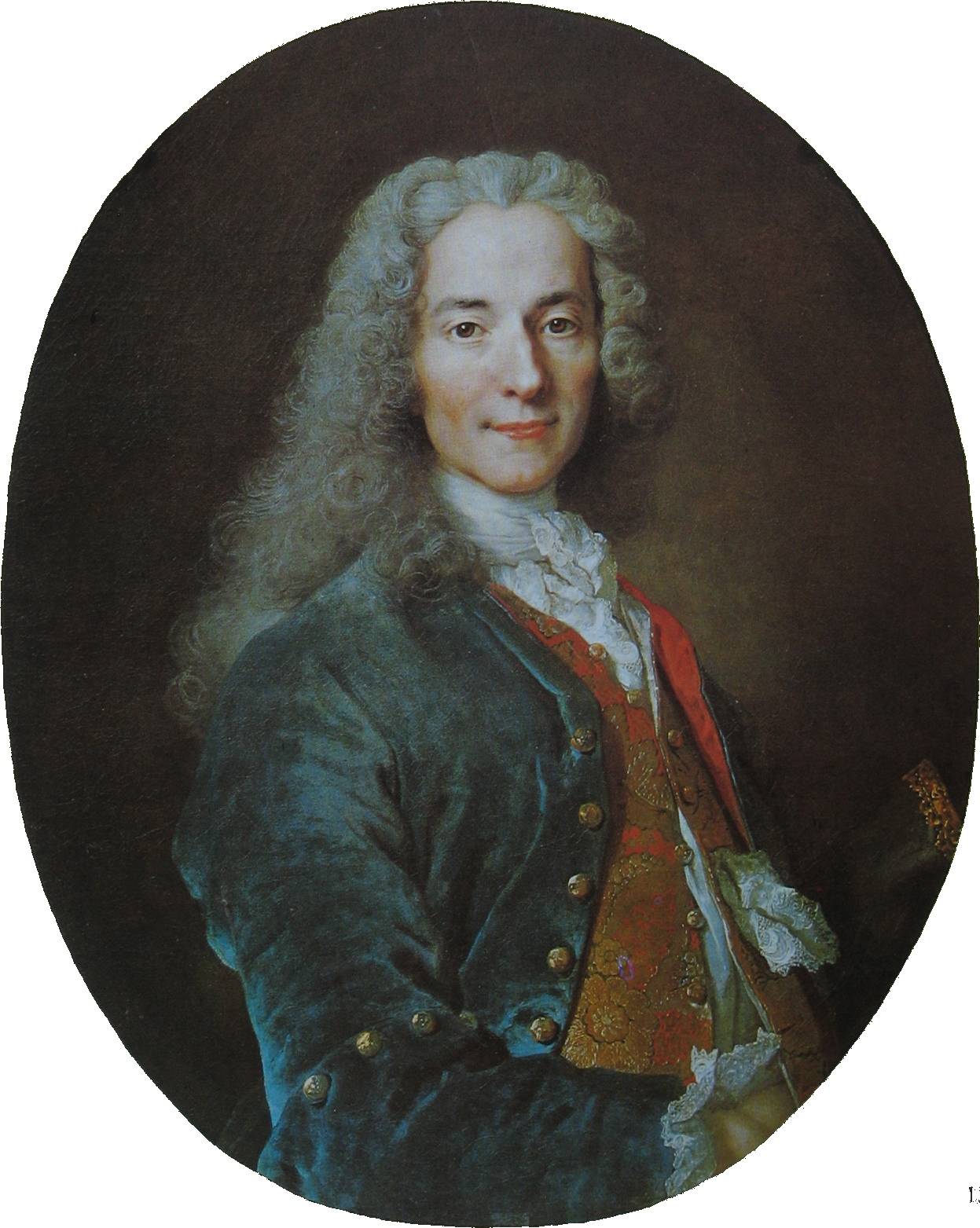
Voltaire born 21 November

=== January–March ===
- January 1 – Abdallah of Morocco, Sultan of Morocco (d. 1757)
- January 3 – Paul of the Cross, Italian mystic (d. 1775)
- January 5 – Theophilus Siegfried Bayer, German sinologist (d. 1738)
- January 6 – Melchor Chyliński, Polish presbyter (d. 1741)
- January 12
  - Oluf Blach, Danish merchant (d. 1767)
  - Johann Heinrich Callenberg, German theologian (d. 1760)
- January 25 – Simon Henry Adolph, Count of Lippe-Detmold (d. 1734)
- January 28 – Peter Collinson, botanist (d. 1768)
- February 1 – Giuseppe Spinelli, Catholic cardinal (d. 1763)
- February 4 – Georg Gottlob Richter, German philosopher and physician (d. 1773)
- February 11 – Henrietta Harley, Countess of Oxford and Countess Mortimer, English noblewoman (d. 1755)
- February 18 – Johann Christoph Handke, Czech painter (d. 1774)
- February 21 – Richard Waldron, Colonial New Hampshire businessman and politician (d. 1753)
- February 24 – Bartolomeo Altomonte, Austrian artist (d. 1783)
- March 11 – Elizabeth Tollet, British poet (d. 1754)
- March 15 – Friedrich Michael Ziegenhagen, English clergyman with German connection (d. 1776)
- March 21 – Daniel Scott, British lexicographer (d. 1759)
- March 24
  - Giuseppe Bernardi, Italian sculptor (d. 1774)
  - Thomas Bullock, Anglican dean (d. 1760)
- March 25 – Christian Otto of Limburg, Reigning count of Limburg-Styrum-Styrum (d. 1749)

=== April–June ===
- April 3 – George Edwards, English naturalist and ornithologist (d. 1773)
- April 14 – Maximilien-Henri de Horion (d. 1759)
- April 25 – Richard Boyle, 3rd Earl of Burlington, English architect (d. 1753)
- April 30 – William Pitkin, Governor of the Connecticut Colony (d. 1769)
- May 7 – Pierre-Jean Mariette, French art historian (d. 1774)
- May 8 – Étienne Lauréault de Foncemagne, French writer (d. 1779)
- May 10 – Michael Harvey, British Member of Parliament (d. 1748)
- May 11
  - Princess Maria Theresia of Liechtenstein, Czech noblewoman (d. 1772)
  - Hieronymus Florentinus Quehl, German composer (d. 1739)
- May 22 – Daniel Gran, Austrian painter (d. 1757)
- June 3 – Scawen Kenrick, English clergyman (d. 1753)
- June 4 – François Quesnay, French economist (d. 1774)
- June 6 – Francis Wollaston, English scientist (d. 1774)
- June 9 – Price Devereux, 10th Viscount Hereford, British politician (d. 1748)
- June 11 – Thomas Willoughby, British politician (d. 1742)
- June 18 – Karl Heinrich von Hoym, German diplomat, statesman and politician (d. 1736)
- June 19 – Jean-André Peyssonnel, French physician (d. 1759)
- June 20 – Hans Adolph Brorson, Danish bishop (d. 1764)
- June 23 – Stamp Brooksbank, MP and Governor of the Bank of England (d. 1756)
- June 24 – Jean-Jacques Burlamaqui, Genevan legal and political theorist (d. 1748)
- June 26 – Georg Brandt, Swedish chemist and mineralogist (d. 1768)
- June 27 – John Michael Rysbrack, Flemish sculptor (d. 1770)
- June 29 – Maria Josepha of Dietrichstein, German noblewoman, member of the House of Dietrichstein; by marriage Countess and later Princess Kinsky of Wchinitz und Tettau (d. 1758)

=== July–September ===
- July 4
  - Claudio Francesco Beaumont, Italian painter (d. 1766)
  - Louis-Claude Daquin, French composer (d. 1772)
- July 11 – Charles-Antoine Coypel, French painter, art commentator, and playwright (d. 1752)
- July 12 – Duchess Gustave Caroline of Mecklenburg-Strelitz, German noble (d. 1748)
- July 16 – Marcus Beresford, 1st Earl of Tyrone, Irish politician (d. 1763)
- July 18
  - Alexander Buturlin, Russian general and courtier (d. 1767)
  - Margarete von Leiningen-Westerburg-Neuleiningen (d. 1761)
- August 1 – Michael Davies, priest (d. 1779)
- August 3 – Marc-Antoine-Nicolas de Croismare, French dilettante (d. 1772)
- August 4 – Étienne-François Avisse, French playwright (d. 1747)
- August 5 – Leonardo Leo, Italian composer (d. 1744)
- August 8 – Francis Hutcheson, Scottish philosopher (d. 1746)
- August 10 – John Leveson-Gower, 1st Earl Gower, British politician (d. 1754)
- August 11 – Giorgio Baffo, Venetian senator and poet (d. 1768)
- August 14
  - James Hamilton, 1st Earl of Clanbrassil, Member of the Parliament of Great Britain (d. 1758)
  - Henry Howard, 4th Earl of Carlisle, English noble and politician (d. 1758)
- August 16 – Réginald Outhier, French astronomer and priest (d. 1774)
- August 19 – Elizabeth Compton, Countess of Northampton, British noble (d. 1741)
- August 20
  - Stephanus Versluys, Dutch colonial governor (d. 1736)
  - Christiane Charlotte of Württemberg-Winnental, German noble (d. 1729)
- August 23 – Johann Georg Schmidt, engraver from Germany (d. 1767)
- August 25
  - Theodore of Corsica, German noble (d. 1756)
  - Hongxi, prince (d. 1742)
- August 26 – Elisha Williams, American rector of Yale College (d. 1755)
- August 27 – Henry Osborn, Royal Navy admiral (d. 1771)
- August 28 – Charlotte Christine of Brunswick-Wolfenbüttel, Grand Duchess of Russia (d. 1715)
- September 6 – Johann Daniel Schöpflin, German historian (d. 1771)
- September 7 – Johan Ludvig Holstein, Danish politician (d. 1763)
- September 9 – John Vanderbank, British artist (d. 1739)
- September 12 – Johan von Mangelsen, Norwegian businessman and general (d. 1769)
- September 13 – Yeongjo of Joseon, 21st King of Joseon Dynasty in Korean history (d. 1776)
- September 18 – Jacques-Ignace de La Touche, painter (d. 1781)
- September 22 – Philip Stanhope, 4th Earl of Chesterfield, British statesman and man of letters (d. 1773)
- September 25 – Henry Pelham, Prime Minister of the United Kingdom (d. 1754)
- September 26 – Martin Schmid, Swiss composer and architect (d. 1772)

=== October–December ===
- October 4
  - George Murray, Scottish Jacobite general (d. 1760)
  - Tsarevna Praskovya Ivanovna of Russia, daughter of Tsar Ivan V of Russia (d. 1731)
- October 9 – Marquard Herrgott, German Benedictine historian and diplomat (d. 1762)
- October 14 – Jacob Bouverie, 1st Viscount Folkestone, British politician (d. 1761)
- October 15
  - Archibald Douglas, 1st Duke of Douglas, Scottish nobleman (d. 1761)
  - William Knollys, English politician from Oxfordshire (d. 1740)
- October 18 – René Louis de Voyer de Paulmy d'Argenson, French statesman (d. 1757)
- October 24 – Humphrey Sydenham, British politician (d. 1757)
- October 26
  - Sir George Oxenden, 5th Baronet, English politician (d. 1775)
  - Johan Helmich Roman, Swedish Baroque composer (d. 1758)
- October 27 – Simon Pelloutier, German historian (d. 1757)
- November 2 – Count Palatine Joseph Charles of Sulzbach, Heir apparent of Neuburg, Sulzbach and the Palatinate (d. 1729)
- November 3
  - John May, English shipwright (d. 1779)
  - William Mackworth Praed, British politician (d. 1752)
- November 5 – Ricardo Wall, Irish-born soldier, diplomat and minister in the Spanish service (d. 1777)
- November 12 – Augustine Washington, British-American planter, slave owner, and the father of George Washington (d. 1743)
- November 16 – Isabella Simons, banker in the Austrian Netherlands (d. 1756)
- November 21 – Voltaire, French writer, historian, and philosopher (d. 1778)
- November 23 – Charlotte Daneau de Muy, Canadian historian (d. 1759)
- November 26 – Louis de Boissy, French writer (d. 1758)
- November 29 – Leopold, Prince of Anhalt-Köthen, German prince and ruler of the principality of Anhalt-Köthen (d. 1728)
- December 2 – William Shirley, British governor of Massachusetts and then of the Bahamas (d. 1771)
- December 10 – Vittorio Francesco, Marquis of Susa, Prince of Savoy (d. 1762)
- December 11 – Johann Michael von Loën, German author (d. 1776)
- December 20 – Andrew Johnston, American politician (d. 1762)
- December 22 – Hermann Samuel Reimarus, German philosopher and writer (d. 1768)
- December 24
  - Louisa Berkeley, Countess of Berkeley, British noble (d. 1716)
  - Christfried Kirch, German astronomer (d. 1740)

== Deaths ==
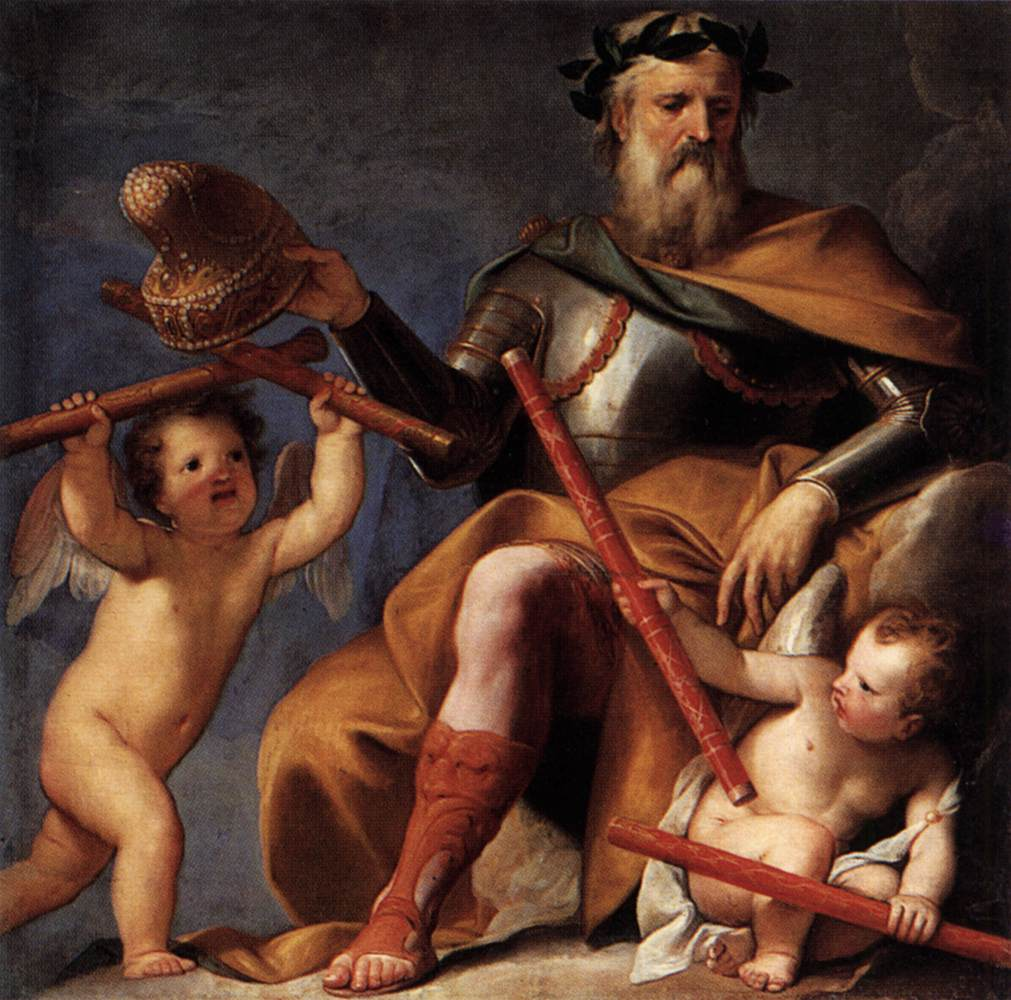
Francesco Morosini died 16 January

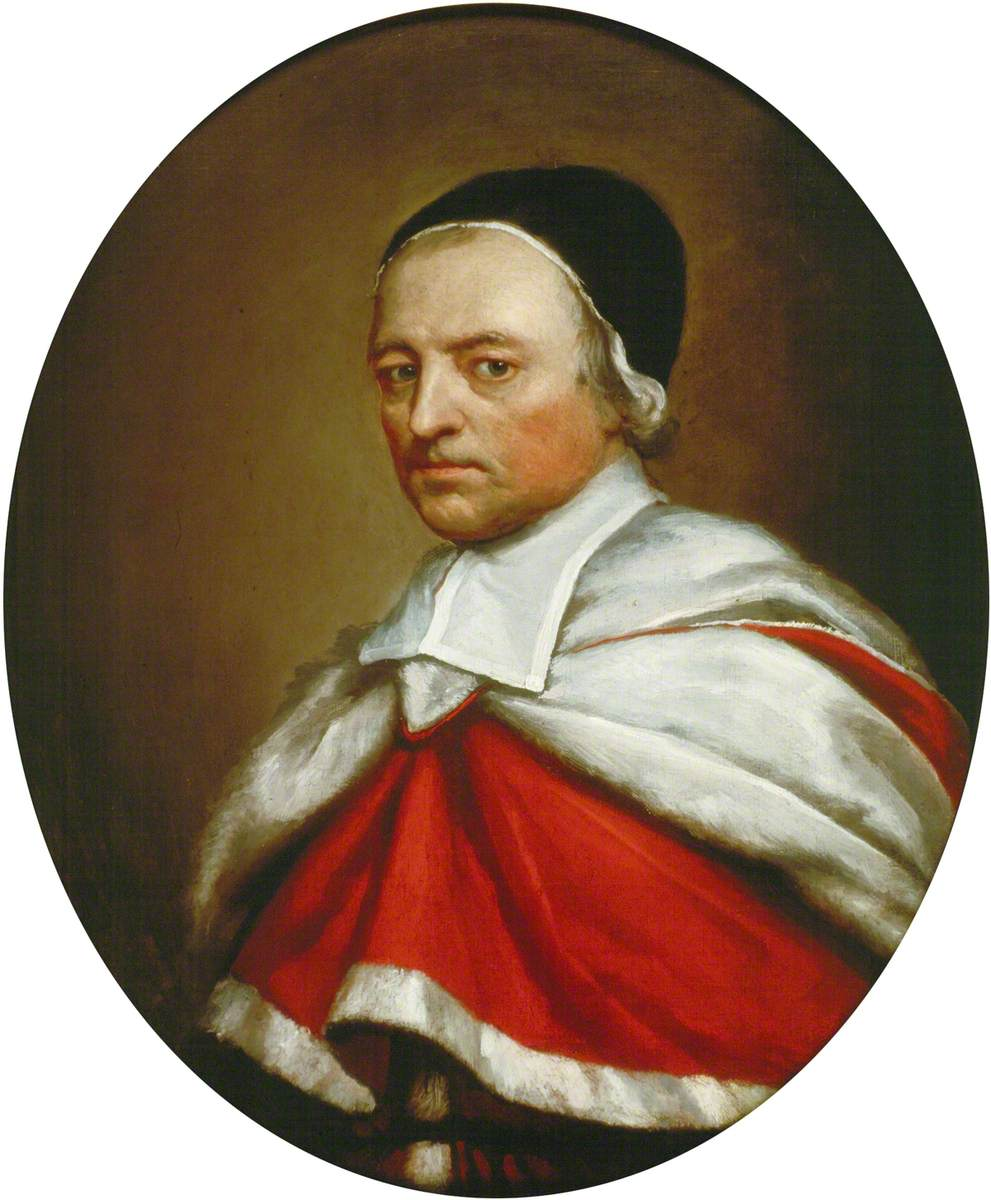
William Dolben (judge) died 25 January

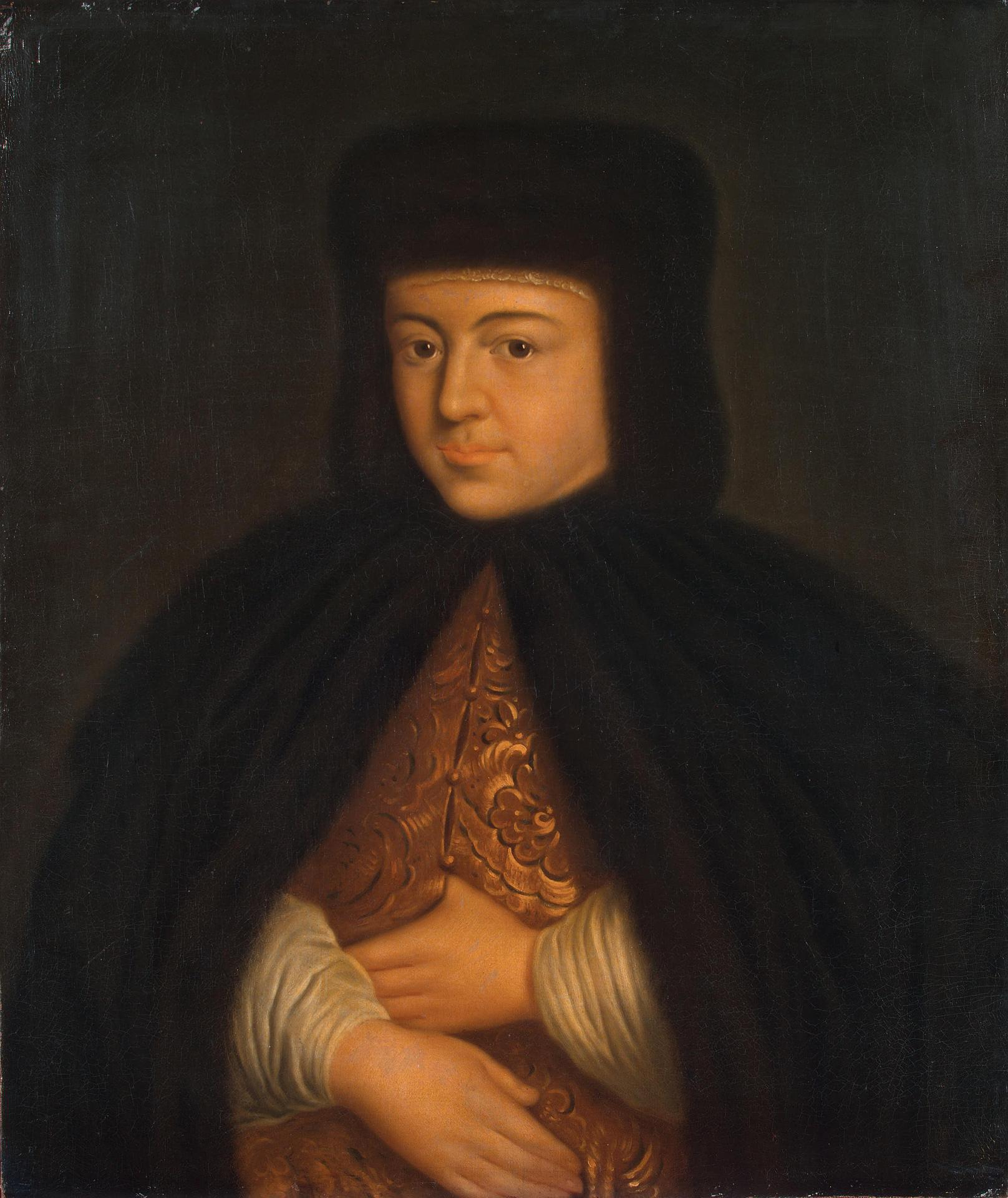
Natalya Naryshkina died 4 February

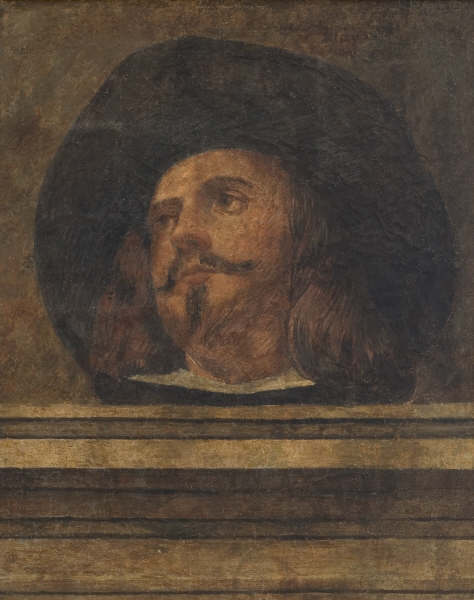
Nicolás de Villacis died 8 April

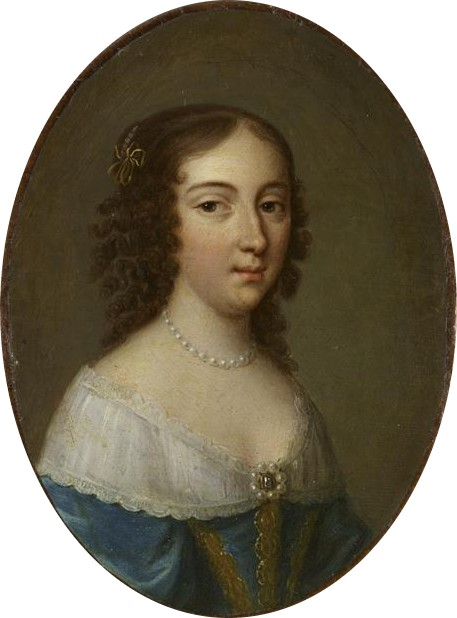
Claire-Clémence de Maillé-Brézé died 16 April

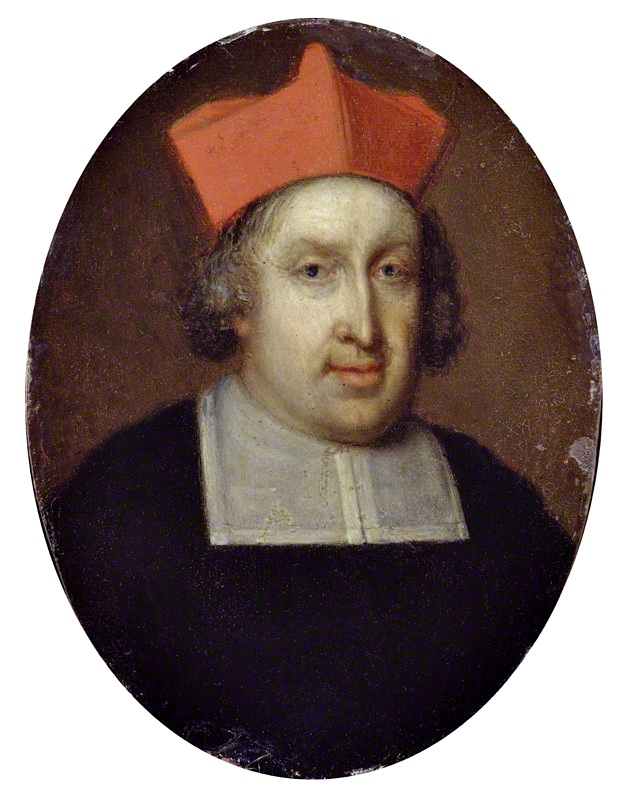
Philip Howard (cardinal) died 17 June

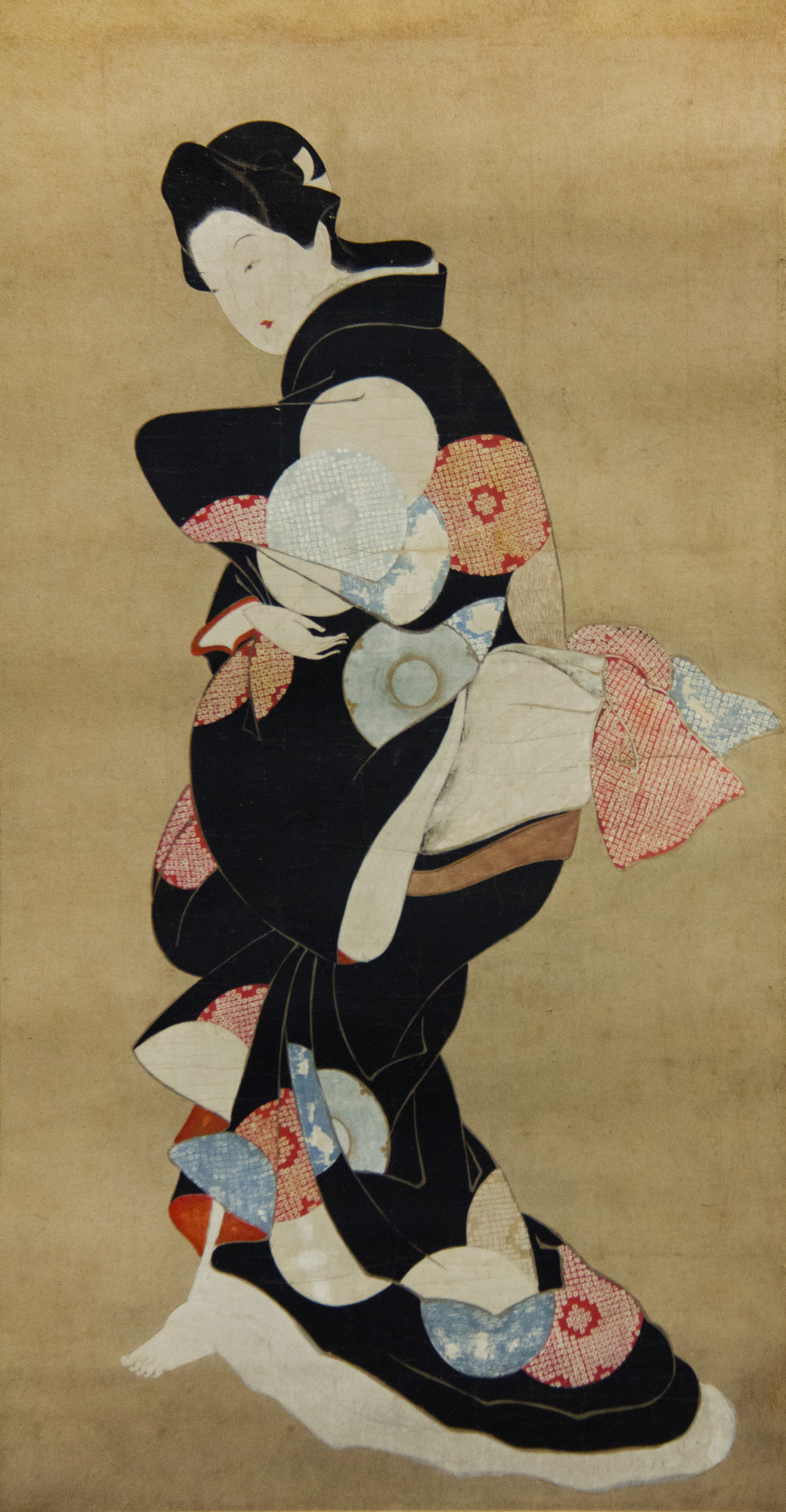
Hishikawa Moronobu died 25 July

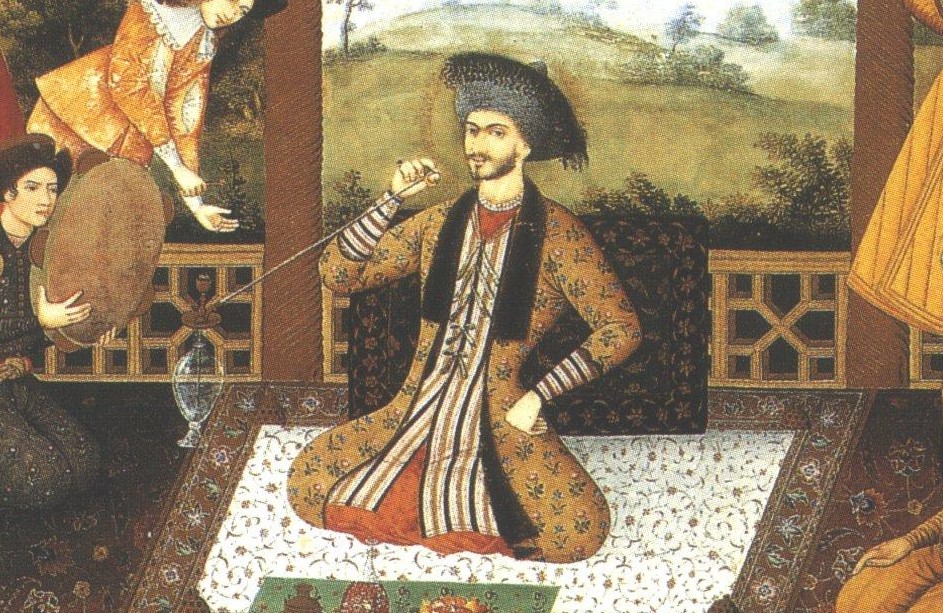
Suleiman I of Persia died 29 July

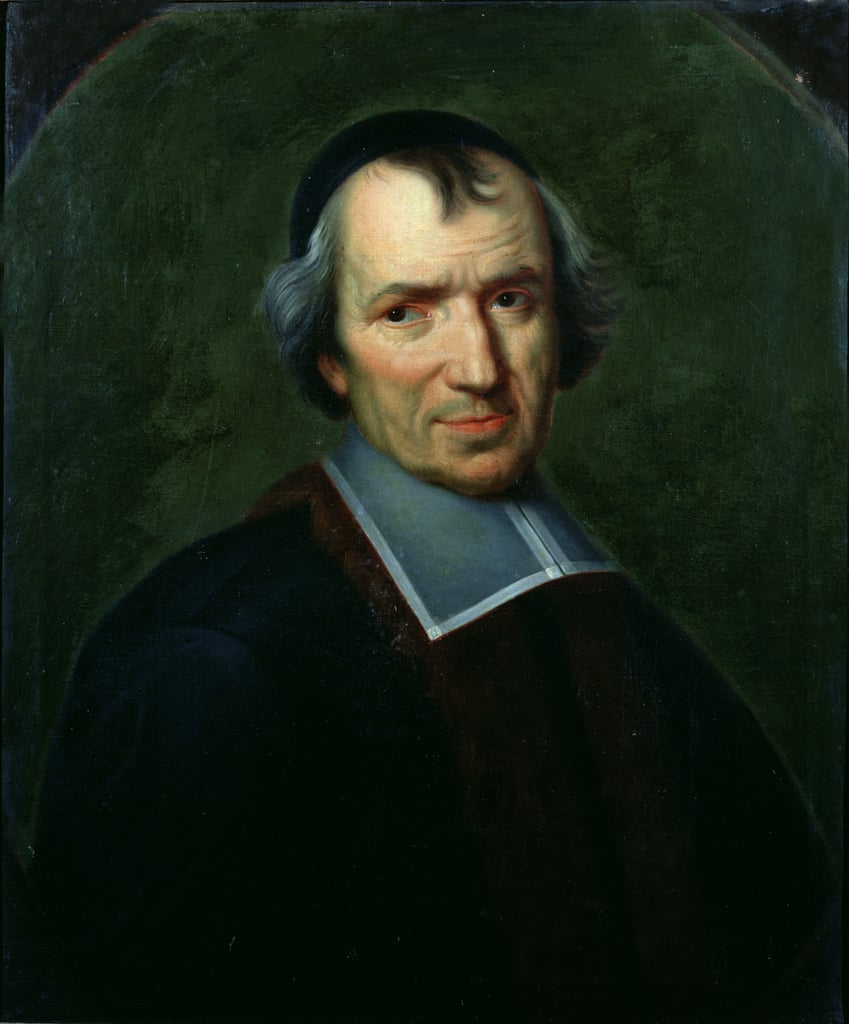
Antoine Arnauld died 8 August

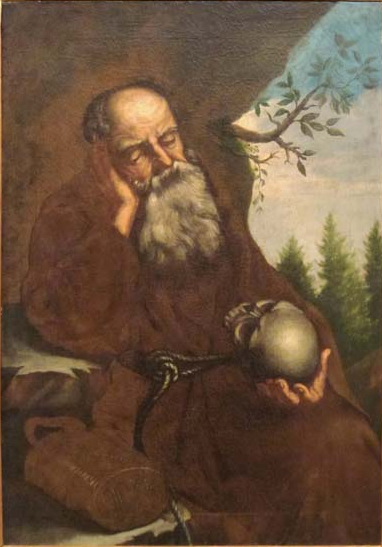
Bernard of Offida died 22 August

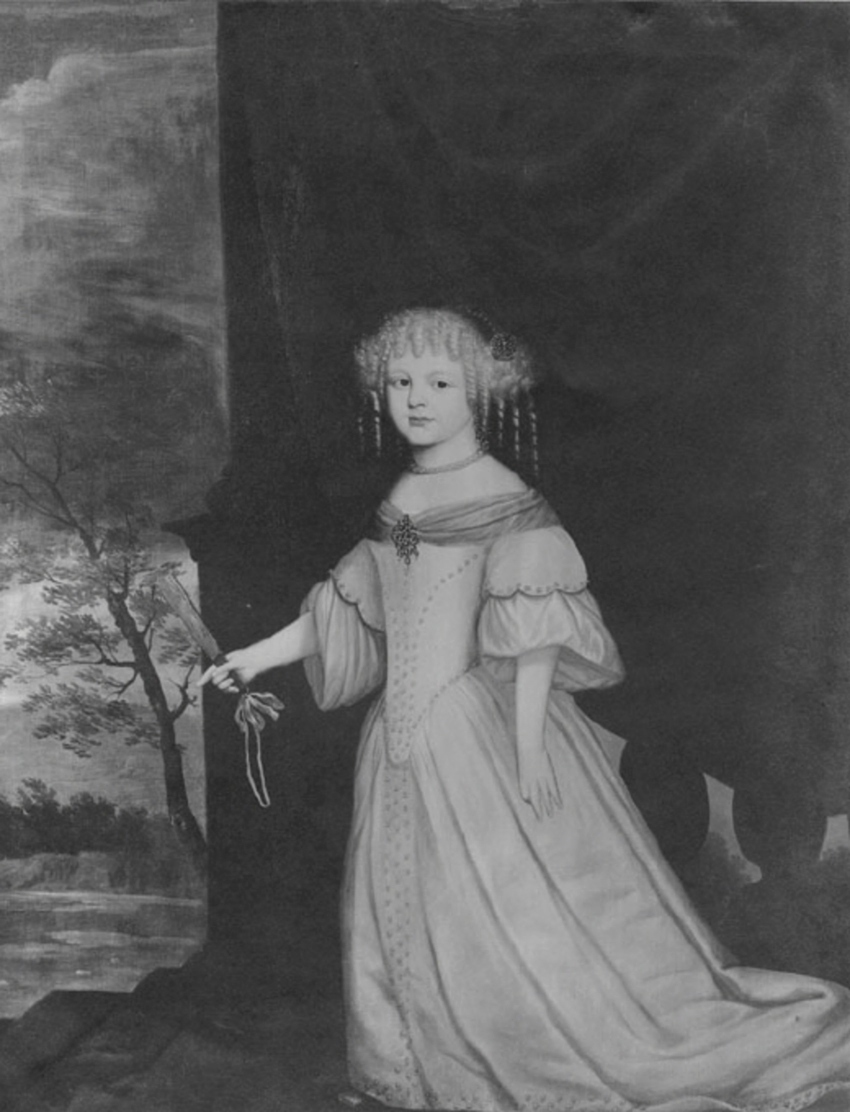
Princess Sophie Auguste of Anhalt-Zerbst died 14 September

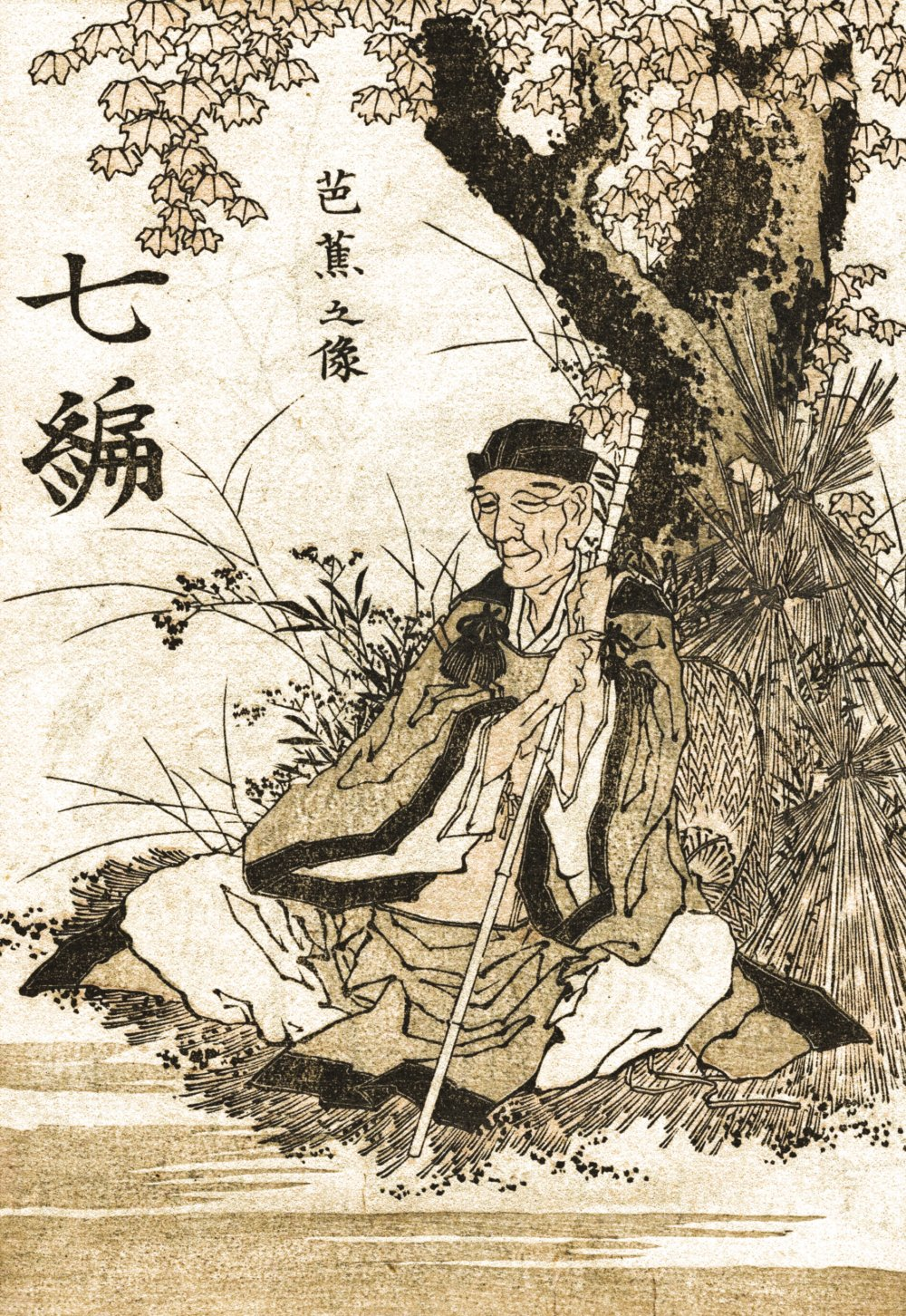
Matsuo Bashō died 28 November

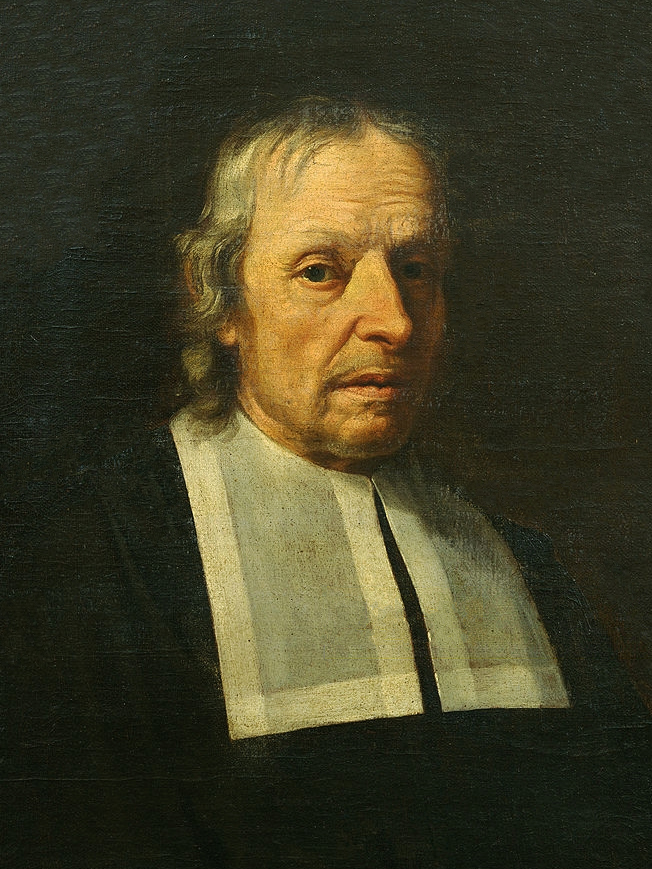
Marcello Malpighi died 29 November

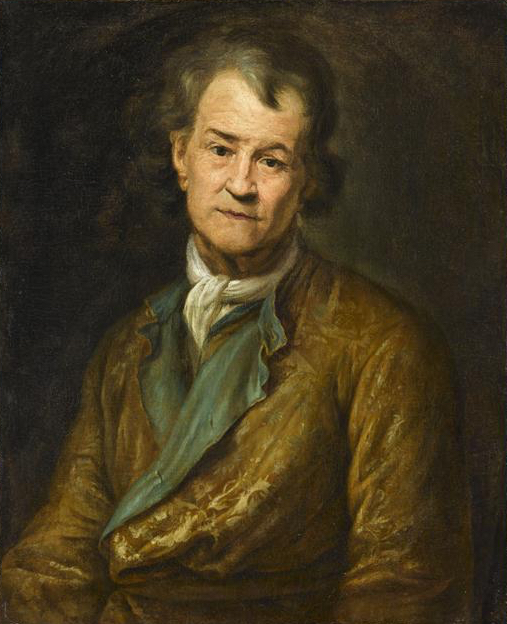
Pierre Puget died 2 December

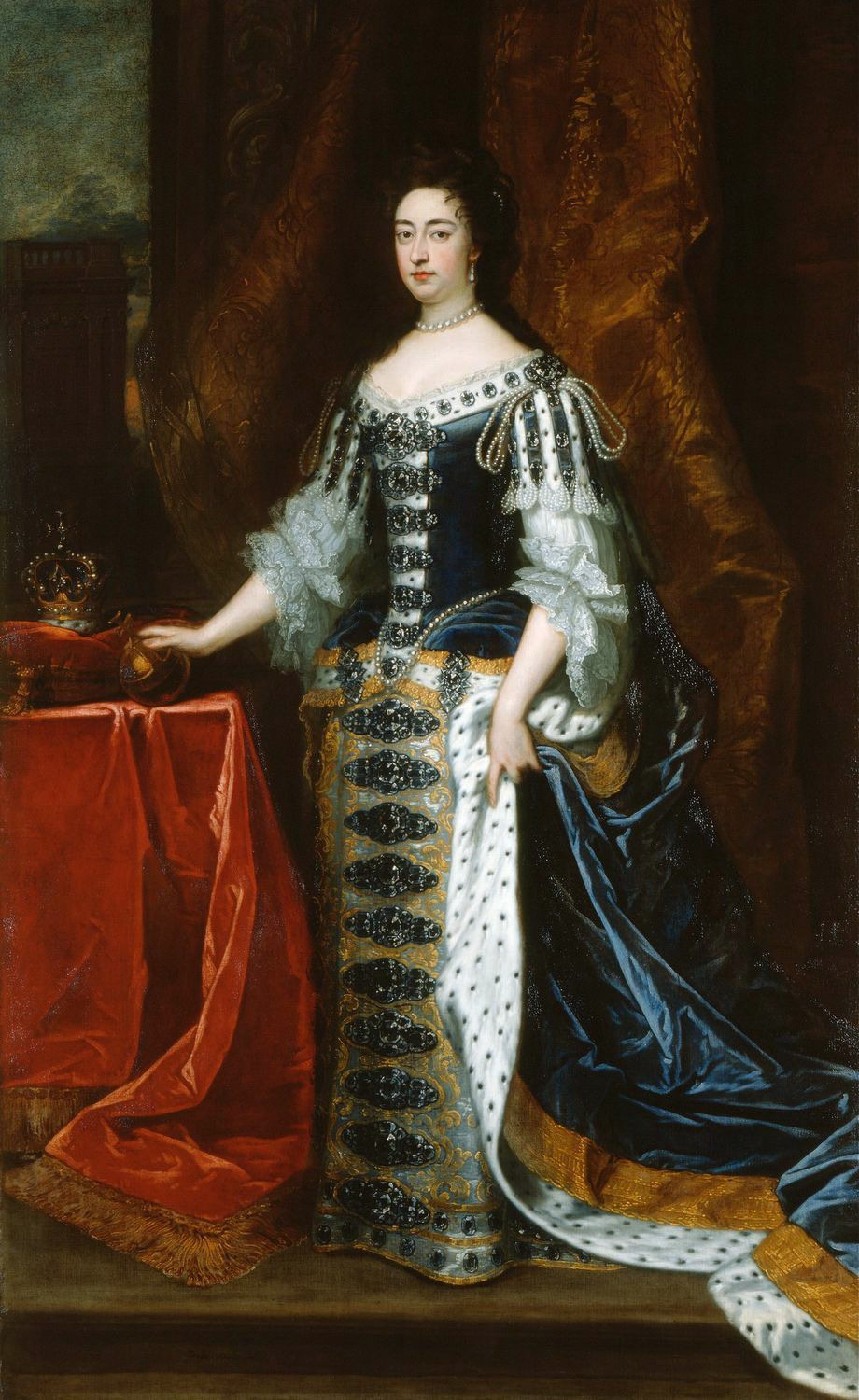
Mary II of England died 28 December

=== January–March ===
- January 2 – Henry Booth, 1st Earl of Warrington, English politician and Earl (b. 1652)
- January 7 – Charles Gerard, 1st Earl of Macclesfield, English aristocrat and soldier (b. c. 1618)
- January 8 – Thomas Strickland, English royalist soldier (b. 1621)
- January 10 – Andrew Balfour, British doctor and botanist (b. 1630)
- January 16
  - John Lamotte Honywood, English Member of Parliament (b. 1647)
  - Francesco Morosini, Doge of Venice from 1688 to 1694 (b. 1619)
- January 17
  - Anselm de Guibours, Augustinian friar and genealogist (b. 1625)
  - Francis Sandford, English herald (b. 1630)
- January 19 – François Marie, Prince of Lillebonne, French nobleman and member of the House of Lorraine (b. 1624)
- January 25 – William Dolben, English judge (b. 1627)
- January 31 – Henry Northleigh, English Member of Parliament (b. 1643)
- February 1 – John Louis of Elderen, Bishop of Liege (b. 1620)
- February 4
  - Leonhard Baldner, French naturalist (b. 1612)
  - Natalya Naryshkina, Tsaritsa of Russia (b. 1651)
- February 8 – Domenico Santi, Italian painter (b. 1621)
- February 9 – Anne-Marie Bigot de Cornuel, French salon-holder (b. 1605)
- February 17 – Antoinette du Ligier de la Garde Deshoulières, French writer, poet (b. 1638)
- February 19
  - Jerzy Franciszek Kulczycki, Polish noble (b. 1640)
  - Gennaro Sanfelice, Roman Catholic archbishop (b. 1622)
  - Francis Wheler, Royal Navy officer (b. 1656)
- February 21 – Simon Abeles, Jewish youth in Prague whose father was accused of murdering him “out of hatred for the Christian faith” (b. 1682)
- February 23 – Sir Thomas Samwell, 1st Baronet, English politician (b. 1650)
- February 25 – Gilles Hallet, Flemish Baroque painter (b. 1620)
- February 26 – Charles Scarborough, English physician and natural philosopher (b. 1615)
- March 5 – Vittoria della Rovere, Italian noble (b. 1622)
- March 10 – Paul Fréart de Chantelou, art collector (b. 1609)
- March 11 – Jean-Nicolas Geoffroy, French harpsichordist and composer (b. 1633)
- March 12 – John Conant, English theologian, clergyman, and academic administrator (b. 1608)
- March 15 – Cresheld Draper, English politician (b. 1646)
- March 24 – Peter Colleton, English politician (b. 1635)
- March 25 – Greenvile Collins, English hydrographer (b. 1643)
- March 26 – Arthur Stanhope, English politician (b. 1627)

=== April–June ===
- April 2 – Richard Martyn, New England Puritan politician (b.c. 1629)
- April 5 – Diego Ibáñez de la Madrid y Bustamente, Roman Catholic bishop (b. 1649)
- April 8 – Nicolás de Villacis, Spanish painter (b. 1616)
- April 9 – Angelo Berardi, Italian composer and music theorist (b. 1630)
- April 10 – Catharina Regina von Greiffenberg, Austrian writer and noble (b. 1633)
- April 12 – John Swinfen, English politician (b. 1613)
- April 13 – José de Jesús María Fajardo, Spanish Roman Catholic prelate; Bishop of Alghero (b. 1643)
- April 14 – Magdalena Sibylla of Neidschutz, German countess (b. 1675)
- April 16 – Claire-Clémence de Maillé-Brézé, French noblewoman (b. 1628)
- April 17 – François IV de Beauharnais, French nobleman (b. 1636)
- April 18 – William Hamilton, Duke of Hamilton in the Peerage of Scotland (b. 1634)
- April 20
  - Giovanni Carlo Antonelli, Roman Catholic prelate, Bishop of Ferentino (b. 1612)
  - Johann Balthasar Lauterbach, German architect and mathematician (b. 1663)
- April 27 – John George IV, Elector of Saxony, German noble (b. 1668)
- May 1 – Maria Elisabeth Lämmerhirt, Mother of Johann Sebastian Bach (b. 1644)
- May 2 – Martin Desjardins, French sculptor (b. 1637)
- May 4 – Ludwig Anton von Pfalz-Neuburg, Roman Catholic bishop (b. 1660)
- May 17 – Johann Michael Bach, German composer (b. 1648)
- May 20 – Robert Spencer, 1st Viscount Teviot, Member of the Parliament of England (b. 1629)
- May 24 – Anthony Cary, 5th Viscount Falkland, English politician (b. 1656)
- May 27 – Thomas Hervey, politician of Ickworth, Suffolk (b. 1625)
- June 2
  - Sir Thomas Skipwith, 1st Baronet, Member of the English Parliament (b. 1620)
  - Gaspar Téllez-Girón, 5th Duke de Osuna, Spanish duke (b. 1625)
- June 8 – Pieter van der Willigen, Dutch painter (b. 1634)
- June 17
  - Louis Chein, French composer (b. 1637)
  - Philip Howard, English Catholic Cardinal (b. 1629)
- June 22 – Thomas Tollemache, English general (b. 1651)
- June 27 – François Louis, Count of Harcourt, French count (b. 1627)
- June 28 – Francisco Spinola, Roman Catholic clergyman (b. 1654)
- June 30 – Pieter Claesen Wyckoff, American farmer and landowner (b. 1625)

=== July–September ===
- July 1
  - Philippe Goibaut, French translator (b. 1626)
  - Justin McCarthy, Viscount Mountcashel, General in the Williamite War in Ireland (b. 1638)
  - Peter Christoffersen Tønder, Norwegian government official (b. 1641)
- July 6 – Francesco Beretta, Italian composer (b. 1640)
- July 11 – Philip Christoph von Königsmarck, Swedish count of Brandenburgian extraction and a soldier (b. 1665)
- July 12 – Juan de Santiago y León Garabito, Spanish Catholic prelate, Bishop of Guadalajara and Bishop of Puerto Rico (b. 1641)
- July 19 – René Ouvrard, French composer (b. 1624)
- July 21 – Jacob Jensen Jersin, Danish-Norwegian theologian, priest, bishop of the Diocese of Christianssand (b. 1633)
- July 25
  - Robert Fleming the elder, Scottish Presbyterian Minister, died 1694 (b. 1630)
  - Hishikawa Moronobu, Japanese painter and printmaker (b. 1618)
- July 27 – George Pitt, English politician (b. 1625)
- July 28 – William Lowther, English Member of Parliament (b. 1668)
- July 29 – Suleiman I of Persia, Shah of Persia from 1666 to 1694 (b. 1647)
- August 1
  - Jean-Claude Rambot, 17th century French sculptor and architect in Aix-en-Provence (b. 1618)
  - John Michael Wright, portrait painter (b. 1617)
- August 5
  - Mareen Duvall, American settler (b. 1625)
  - Mogens Skeel, Danish playwright (b. 1651)
- August 6 – Gabriel de la Corte, Spanish painter (b. 1648)
- August 8 – Antoine Arnauld, French theologian, philosopher, mathematician (b. 1612)
- August 21 – Tommaso Saladini, Roman Catholic bishop (b. 1647)
- August 22
  - Samuel Aboab, rabbi (b. 1610)
  - Maria Sofia De la Gardie, Swedish countess and industrialist (b. 1627)
  - Bernard of Offida, Italian saint (b. 1604)
- August 28 – Francesco Antonio Picchiatti, Italian architect (b. 1617)
- August 29 – Sir Richard Everard, 2nd Baronet, English politician (b. 1625)
- August 30 – Louis de Crevant, Duke of Humières, Marshal of France (b. 1628)
- September 3 – Jean Barbier d'Aucour, French lawyer to the parliament of Paris, ardent Jansenist and satirist (b. 1641)
- September 6 – Francesco II d'Este, Duke of Modena, Italian noble (b. 1660)
- September 7 – Andrija Zmajević, Serbian poet (b. 1624)
- September 10 – Thomas Lloyd, Lieutenant-governor of provincial Pennsylvania and Quaker preacher (b. 1640)
- September 14
  - Princess Sophie Auguste of Anhalt-Zerbst (b. 1663)
  - Jonathan Cope, English politician; (b. 1664)
  - Thomas Savage, 3rd Earl Rivers, English Earl (b. 1628)
- September 22 – Henry Neville, English politician (b. 1620)
- September 24 – Jean Garet, French monk (b. 1627)
- September 27 – Giuseppe Colombi, musician, composer (b. 1635)
- September 28 – Gabriel Mouton, French abbot and scientist (b. 1619)
- September 29
  - Leopold Louis, Count Palatine of Veldenz, German noble (b. 1625)
  - Katarzyna Sobieska, Polish noble (b. 1634)

=== October–December ===
- October 6 – Sugiyama Waichi, Japanese acupuncturist (b. 1610)
- October 9 – Jean-Louis Bergeret, French lawyer (b. 1641)
- October 12
  - Charles Boyle, 3rd Viscount Dungarvan, British politician (b. 1639)
  - Delphin Strungk, German composer (b. 1601)
- October 13 – Johann Christoph Pezel, German violinist, trumpeter and composer (b. 1639)
- October 18 – Pierre Ango, French Catholic priest and scientist (b. 1640)
- October 19 – Pierre Menault, French composer (b. 1642)
- October 20 – Christian II, Duke of Saxe-Merseburg (b. 1653)
- October 26 – Samuel von Pufendorf, German philosopher (b. 1632)
- October 27 – Gevherhan Sultan, Daughter of Ottoman Sultan Ibrahim I (b. 1642)
- October 30
  - Francis Fenwick, English monk (b. 1645)
  - Raimondo del Pozzo, Roman Catholic prelate, Bishop of Vieste (b. 1622)
- November 7 – Jacques de Claeuw, painter from the Northern Netherlands (b. 1623)
- November 14 – Christian III Maurice, Duke of Saxe-Merseburg, German duke (b. 1680)
- November 16 – Jacques-Théodore de Bryas, clergyman from the Low Countries, bishop of Saint-Omer and archbishop of Cambrai (b. 1631)
- November 22 – John Tillotson, Archbishop of Canterbury (b. 1630)
- November 23
  - Vicente de Gonzaga y Doria, Viceroy of Valencia, 1663, Viceroy of Catalonia, 1664–1667 and Viceroy of Sicily 1679 (b. 1602)
  - Jean Talon, first Intendant of New France (b. 1626)
- November 25 – Ismaël Bullialdus, French astronomer (b. 1605)
- November 28 – Matsuo Bashō, Japanese poet (b. 1644)
- November 29 – Marcello Malpighi, Italian physician (b. 1628)
- December 2 – Pierre Puget, French painter, sculptor, architect and engineer (b. 1620)
- December 4
  - Bernardin Gigault de Bellefonds, Marshal of France (b. 1630)
  - Jean-Baptiste Boisot, French abbot, bibliophile and scholar (b. 1638)
- December 5 – William Beecher, English politician (b. 1628)
- December 7 – Tiberio Fiorilli, Italian-born actor (b. 1608)
- December 9 – Paolo Segneri, Italian Jesuit (b. 1624)
- December 11 – Ranuccio II Farnese, Duke of Parma from 1646 until his death (b. 1630)
- December 12 – Filippo Lauri, Italian painter (b. 1623)
- December 20 – Erasmus Finx, German polymath (b. 1627)
- December 24 – Giovanni Paolo Meniconi, Catholic bishop (b. 1629)
- December 26 – Francis Cuffe, politician (b. 1654)
- December 27 – Henrik Span, naval officer in the Dutch (b. 1634)
- December 28
  - Henry Arundell, 3rd Baron Arundell of Wardour, English Baron (b. 1607)
  - Mary II, Queen of England, Scotland, and Ireland (b. 1662)
- date unknown – Hafız Post, Turkish musician (b. c. 1630)
