= Loen =

Loen may refer to:

== People ==
- Dagfinn Loen
- Johann Michael von Loën (1694–1776), German writer and statesman
- John van Loen (born 1965), Dutch football player
- Maria of Loen-Heinsberg
- Sjur Loen (born 1958), Norwegian curler
- Youri Loen (born 1991), Dutch football player

== Places ==
- Loen, Norway

== Other ==
- LOEN Entertainment, South Korean record label
