= Vianen (disambiguation) =

Vianen may refer to:

- Vianen, a city in Utrecht, the Netherlands
- Vianen (North Brabant), a hamlet in the Netherlands
- Vianen (Zeeland), a former hamlet in the Netherlands
- Vianen (ship), a sailing ship

== People ==
- Gerard Vianen (born 1944), Dutch cyclist
