= Anton August Beck =

German engraver

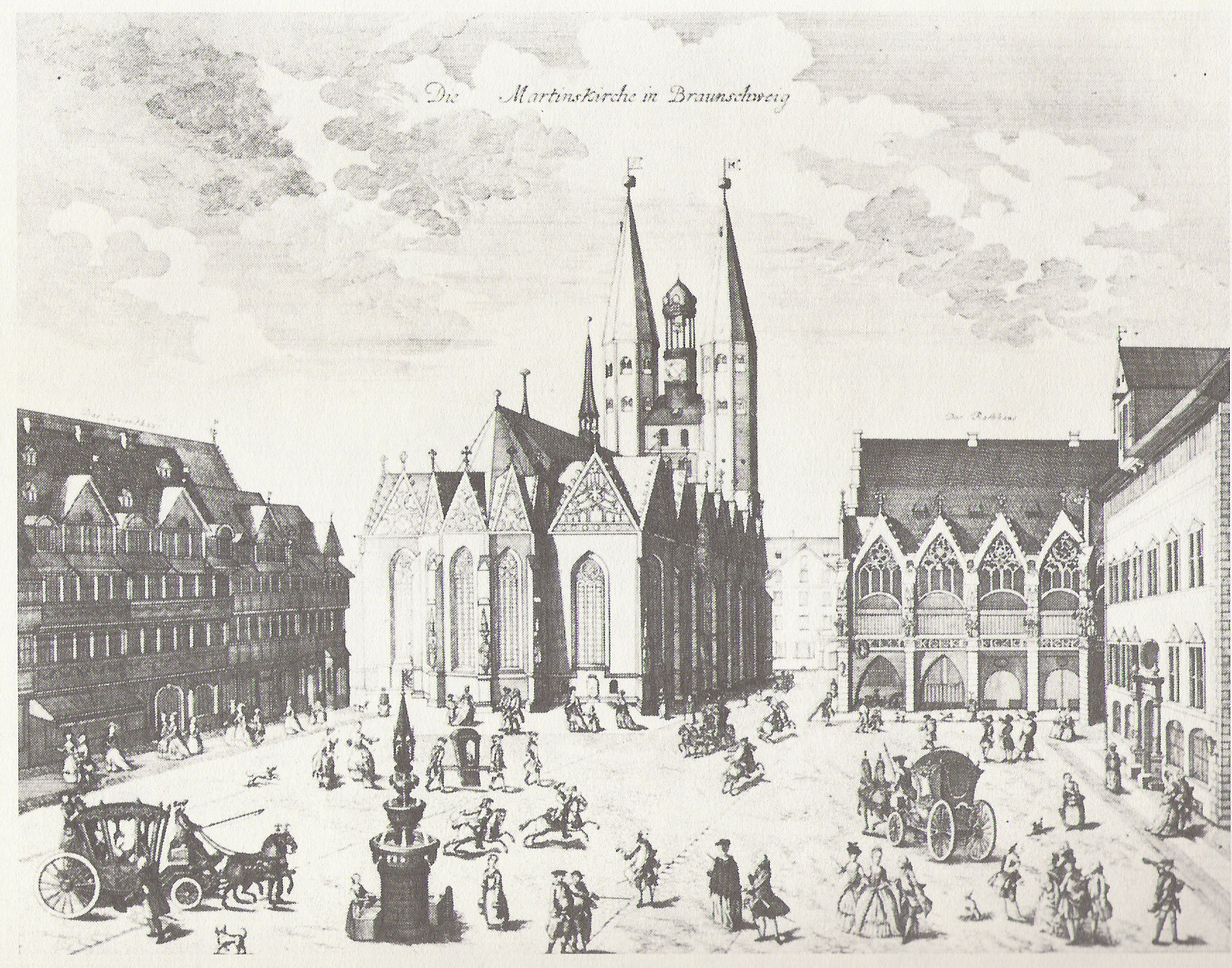
Copperplate engraving of the Old Town Market in Braunschweig with St. Martin's church by Anton August Beck, 1776

Anton August Beck (27 August 1713, Braunschweig - 17 March 1787, Braunschweig) was a German engraver. He was the son of Johann Georg Beck and his wife Anna Elisabeth. On Johann's death, his student Johann Georg Schmidt married his widow and adopted his business. On Schmidt's death, Anton took over the business.
