= Johann Georg Beck =

German engraver

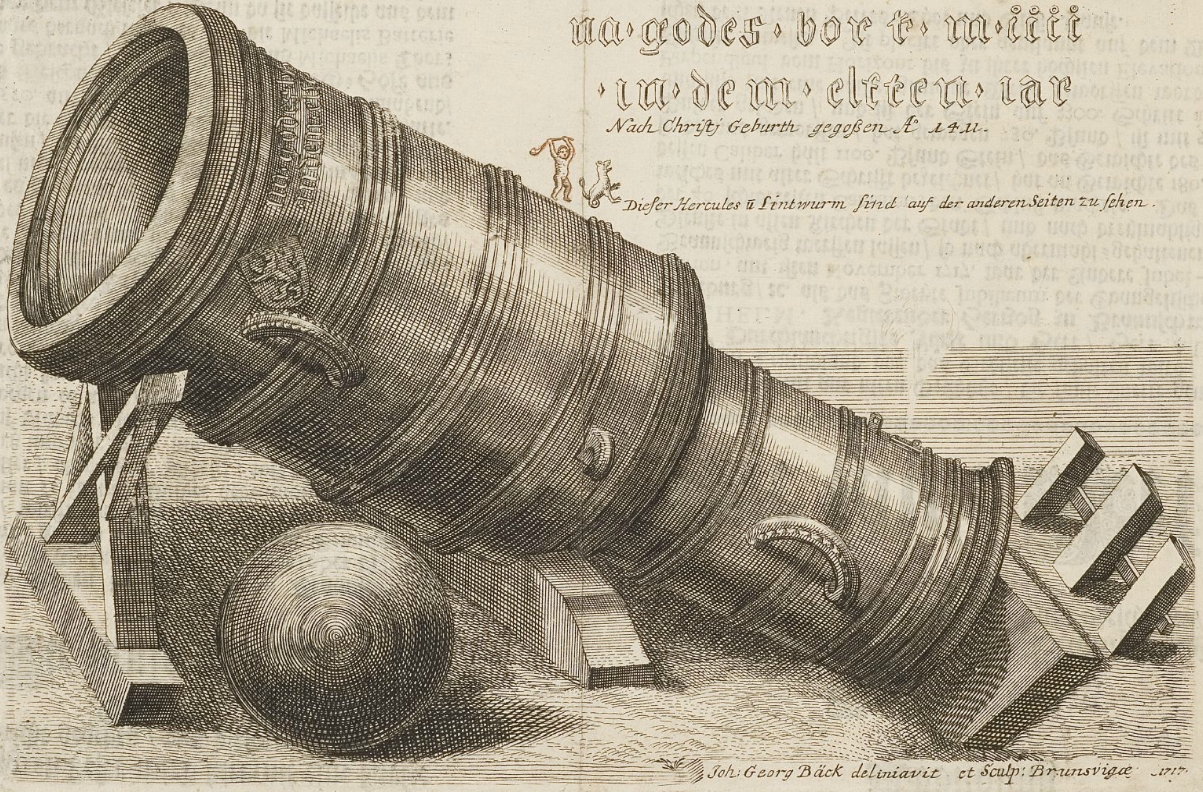
Die Faule Mette in Braunschweig by Johann Georg Beck, 1717

Johann Georg Beck or Johann Georg Baek (24 April 1676 in Augsburg – 7 August 1722 in Braunschweig) was a German engraver. He taught fellow-Augsburger Johann Georg Schmidt, who married his widow Anna Elisabeth and took over the family studio. Johann's son Anton August Beck trained in this studio and inherited it on Johann's death.
