= Johann Georg Schmidt (engraver) =

Johann Georg Schmidt (23 August 1694, Augsburg - 15 March 1767, Braunschweig) was a German engraver.

== Life and work ==
Schmidt came from Augsburg and first worked in Dresden and then the studio of Johann Georg Beck, also from Augsburg. After Beck died in 1722, Schmidt married his widow Anna Elisabeth (née Füllekrug), took over his studio and received the title of court-engraver. Schmidt trained his master's son Anton August in this studio. Schmidt and Beck mostly made portraits of the Braunschweigischen clergy and court figures, though his works were of lower quality than his predecessor and his son.

After his death in 1767, his stepson Anton August Beck took over his birth-father's business and successfully led it until he died in 1787.

== Bibliography ==
- Horst-Rüdiger Jarck (Hrsg.): Braunschweigisches Biographisches Lexikon. 8. bis 18. Jahrhundert, Braunschweig 2006
- Gerd Spies (Hrsg.): Braunschweig – Das Bild der Stadt in 900 Jahren. Geschichte und Ansichten, Band 2, Braunschweig 1985
