= Giuseppe Colombi =

Italian musician and composer

Giuseppe Colombi (Modena, 1635-Modena, 27 or 29 September 1694) was an Italian musician and composer, active in the Baroque period. In 1674, he was named maestro di cappella for the court in Modena. In 1678, he replaced Giovanni Maria Bononcini as maestro of the Cathedral of Modena. He wrote various symphonies, sonatas, and balletti.

== Sources ==
- Boni, Filippo de' (1852). Biografia degli artisti ovvero dizionario della vita e delle opere dei pittori, degli scultori, degli intagliatori, dei tipografi e dei musici di ogni nazione che fiorirono da'tempi più remoti sino á nostri giorni. (2nd ed.). Venice; Googlebooks: Presso Andrea Santini e Figlio. p. 238.
