= Simon Abeles =

Simon Abeles (1681 – 21 February 1694) was a Prague Jewish boy who died under unclear circumstances in the age of twelve. His Christian contemporaries put Simon's death in context of his desire to be baptized and was considered a religiously motivated murder.

== Life and death ==
Simon Abeles was born in a prominent Prague Jewish family. His father Lazar Abeles was a merchant. Simon's grandfather Moyses ben David Bunzel Abeles was the mayor of the Jewish Community in Prague.

In the 1690s the Prague Jesuits led an aggressive missionary campaign focused on Jewish children and adolescents, encouraging them to become Christian. In the summer of 1693, 12-year-old Simon Abeles decided to resolve his problematic relations with his father by running away from home to the Jesuits in Clementinum (St. Clement's Jesuit College in the Old Town of Prague) where he learned the basics of the Catholic faith. Later his father took him back home.

The tension continued between the fierce-tempered father and the defiant son, who was often beaten. On 21 February 1694, the boy's severe punishment ended in tragedy. Simon was hit so hard (probably by his relative Löbl Kurtzhandel in presence of Simon's father Lazar) that he fell and broke his neck. The two men tried to cover up the incident by hastily burying the body, but the affair soon came to light as a result of denunciation. The authorities ordered the body exhumed and arrested the boy's father, his third wife Leah and their cook. Lazar hanged himself, from fear of being tortured. Kurtzhandel was arrested and later was the only one to stand trial. There are alternative interpretations of the incident that indicate another conclusion.

The Jesuits sought the boy's beatification. The appellate court of the Kingdom of Bohemia allegedly fabricated a charge of premeditated murder out of hatred for the faith. On 31 March 1694 the boy was buried as a martyr with great pomp in the Church of Our Lady before Týn in Prague. Löbl Kurtzhandel was sentenced to be broken on a wheel. In order to reduce his suffering, however, he agreed to be baptized and before his beheading publicly admitted to the killing (although not to murder).
