= Charlotte Daneau de Muy =

Canadian ursuline and annalist

Charlotte Daneau de Muy of Saint Hélène (November 23, 1694 – September 14, 1759) was a Canadian ursuline and annalist. She was the daughter of Nicolas Daneau de Muy and Marguerite Boucher.

== Sources ==
- Lapointe, Gabrielle. "DANEAU DE MUY, CHARLOTTE, dite de Sainte-Hélène". Dictionary of Canadian Biography Online. Vol. 3. University of Toronto.
