= Jacques-Ignace de La Touche =

French painter

Jacques-Ignace, chevalier de la Touche-Loisy (1694–1781) was a French painter of miniatures and portraits.

He was born at Châlons-sur-Marne. The beautifully executed canons for the altar of the church of Notre-Dame at Châlons are almost the only examples of his work which have not disappeared. The Chevalier Delatouche, who was also a poet, died at Châlons.

He published les étrennes du temps & le saint usage que les chrétiens en doivent faire, Paris, 1741.
