= Étienne-François Avisse =

French playwright (1694–1747)

Étienne-François Avisse (4 August 1694 – 23 December 1747) was an 18th-century French playwright.

Avisse was born and died in Paris, and gave the Comédie-Française and the Comédie Italienne some comedies, of which the most famous are:

- 1730: le Divorce ou les époux mécontents
- 1730: la Réunion forcée, composed about a famous trial the actress Marie-Anne Duclos had brought with her husband, Pierre-Jacques Chemin actor, so that their marriage be annulled
- 1731: la Gouvernante, critic of the théâtre larmoyant which inspired le Vieux célibataire by Collin d’Harleville ;
- 1742: le Valet embarrassé ou la vieille amoureuse, which gave the idea for the opéra comique Ma Tante Aurore ;
- 1743: les Petits-Maîtres that marked an epoch, since it was during the course of the performance that the actors imagined to give on the stage fireworks composed by the Ruggieri brothers from Bologna ;
- les Faux Marquis ou les Bourgeois petits-maîtres, etc.

== Sources ==
- Gustave Vapereau, Dictionnaire universel des littératures, Paris, Hachette, 1876, p. 175.
