= Friedrich Michael Ziegenhagen =

German-English clergyman

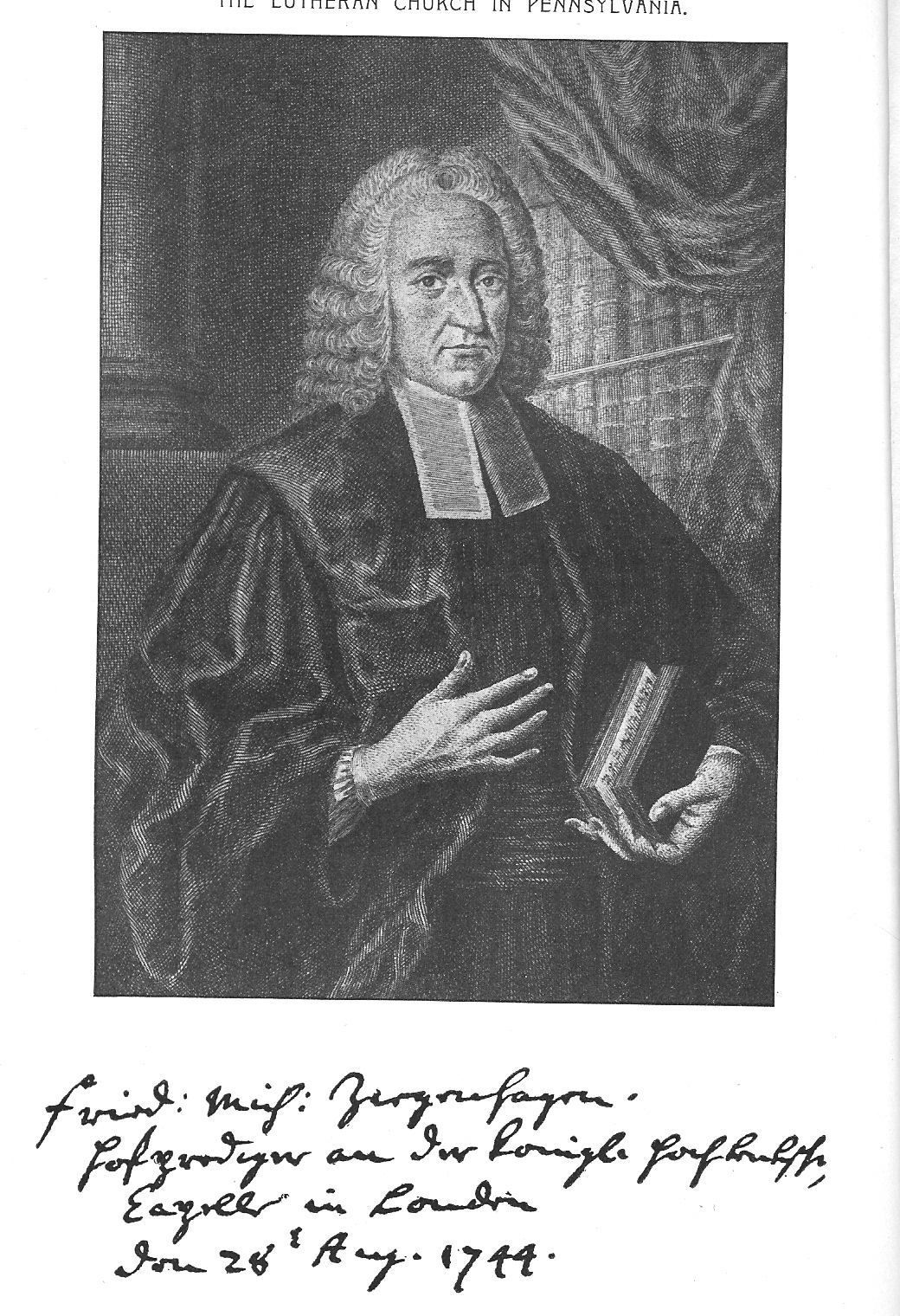
Friedrich Michael Ziegenhagen, portrait and autograph

The Reverend Friedrich Michael Ziegenhagen (1694 – 24 January 1776) was a German-English clergyman, who worked as a court preacher for the Hanoverian King George I of Great Britain. At the same time, he was a prominent Pietist and one of the most prominent members of the Society for Promoting Christian Knowledge (SPCK).

== Life ==
He was born in Naugard, Prussian Province of Pomerania (modern Nowogard, Poland) in 1694. In April 1714, he began to study theology at University of Halle where he was influenced by August Hermann Francke. In 1717 he moved to complete his studies at the University of Jena. After finishing his studies he became a private teacher in the home of Count von Platen at Linden near Hanover. In 1722 he was appointed German Lutheran court preacher at the Royal Court in London where he remained for the rest of his life.

Ziegenhagen was connected to Pietists in many European countries. Moreover he maintained contacts between those Pietists and the missions in North America – particularly the community of Salzburgers at Ebenezer, Georgia – and in Southern India (Tranquebar, Madras) where he also supported the Danish-Halle Mission. Due to his religious convictions, Ziegenhagen remained unmarried.

== See also ==
- Society for Promoting Christian Knowledge
