= Jean Garet =

Jean Garet (c. 1627 at Le Havre – 24 September 1694 at Jumièges) was a French Benedictine scholar of the Congregation of Saint-Maur.

== Lifre ==
He was professed in 1647 when he was twenty years old, and lived in the Abbey of Saint-Ouen at Rouen.

== Works ==
While there, he prepared an edition of Cassiodorus which was published at Rouen in 1679. Mommsen's criticism on his edition of the Variae, which was included in the above work, is very severe: "A work without either skill or learning - Garet took Fournier's text (Paris, 1579) as a basis, and inserted alterations of his own rather than corrections." (Mon. Germ. Hist.: Auct. antiq., XII, cxv). As a preface to his edition Garet wrote a dissertation in which he tried to prove that Cassiodorus was a Benedictine. Migne followed the Garet edition in Patrologia Latina, LXIX-LXX. It does not contain the Complexiones, a work discovered later by Maffei.
