= Anne-Marie Bigot de Cornuel =

French salon-holder (1605–1694)

- Born: 1605
- Died: 1694

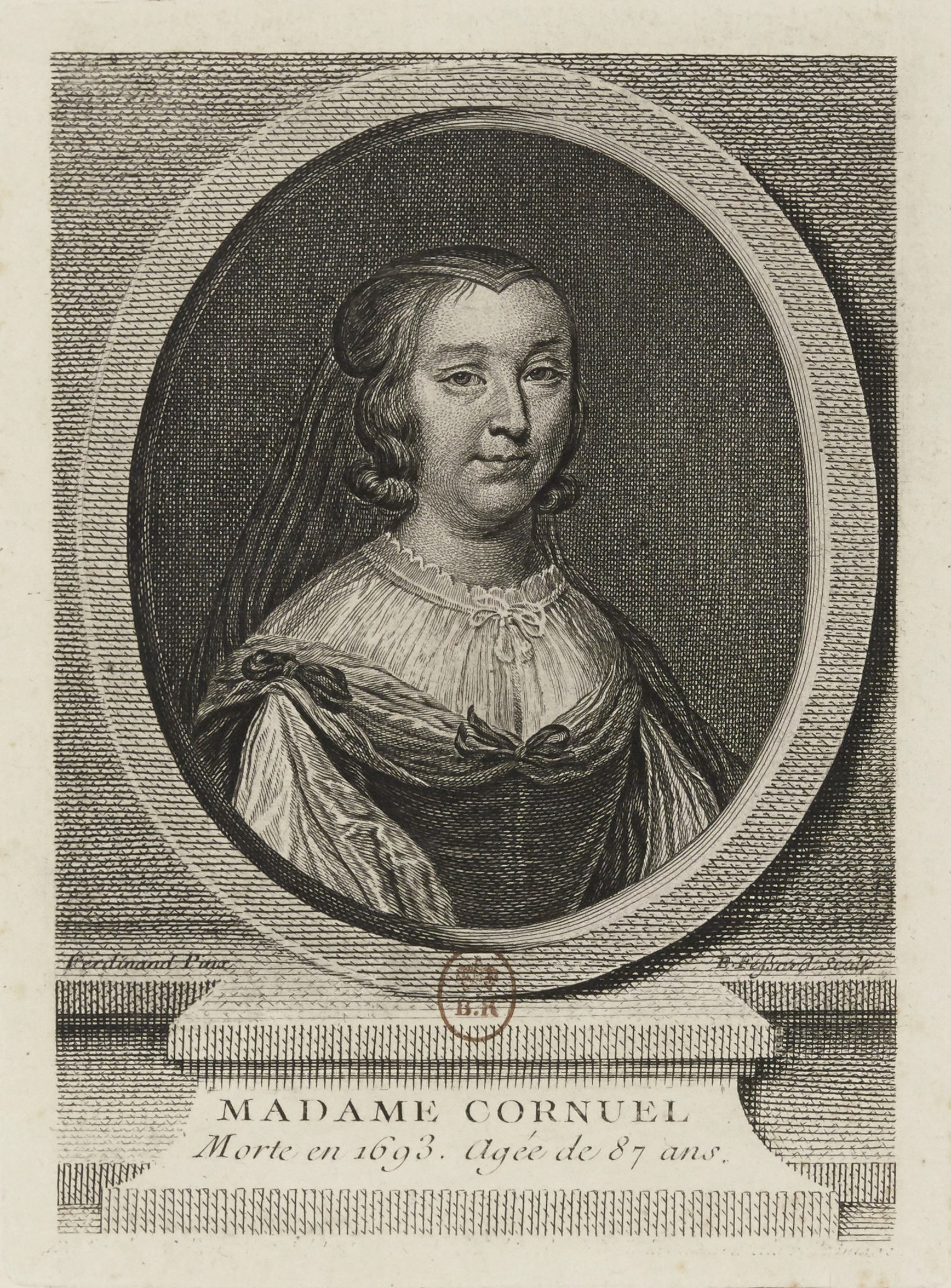
Madame Cornuel Gallica

Anne-Marie Bigot de Cornuel (1605–1694) was a French salonnière. After having been widowed in 1650, she established a famed literary salon in Paris. She was known for her witty remarks and was often quoted.
