= Louis Chein =

French priest and composer (1637–1694)

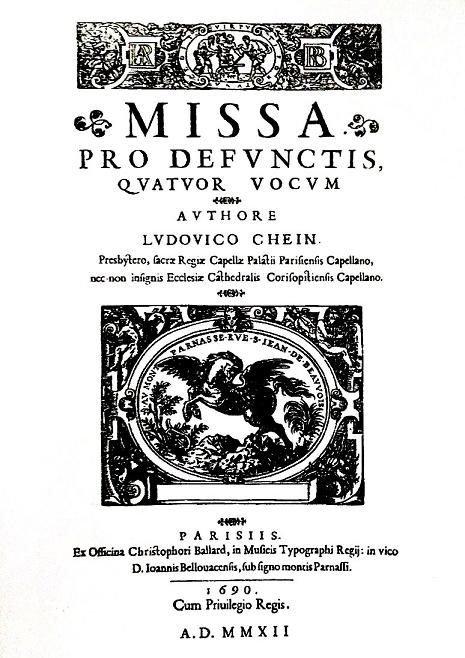

Louis Chein (Paris, 1637–1694) was a French priest and composer best known for his requiem mass for four voices published by Ballard in 1690. The "Ne recorderis"; and "Dirige Domine" of Chein's mass were selected by conductor Raphael Pichon for inclusion in the composite requiem mass Les Funerailles Royales de Louis XIV for the funeral of Louis XIV (1715) performed and videotaped in 2015.
