= Simon Pelloutier =

French historian

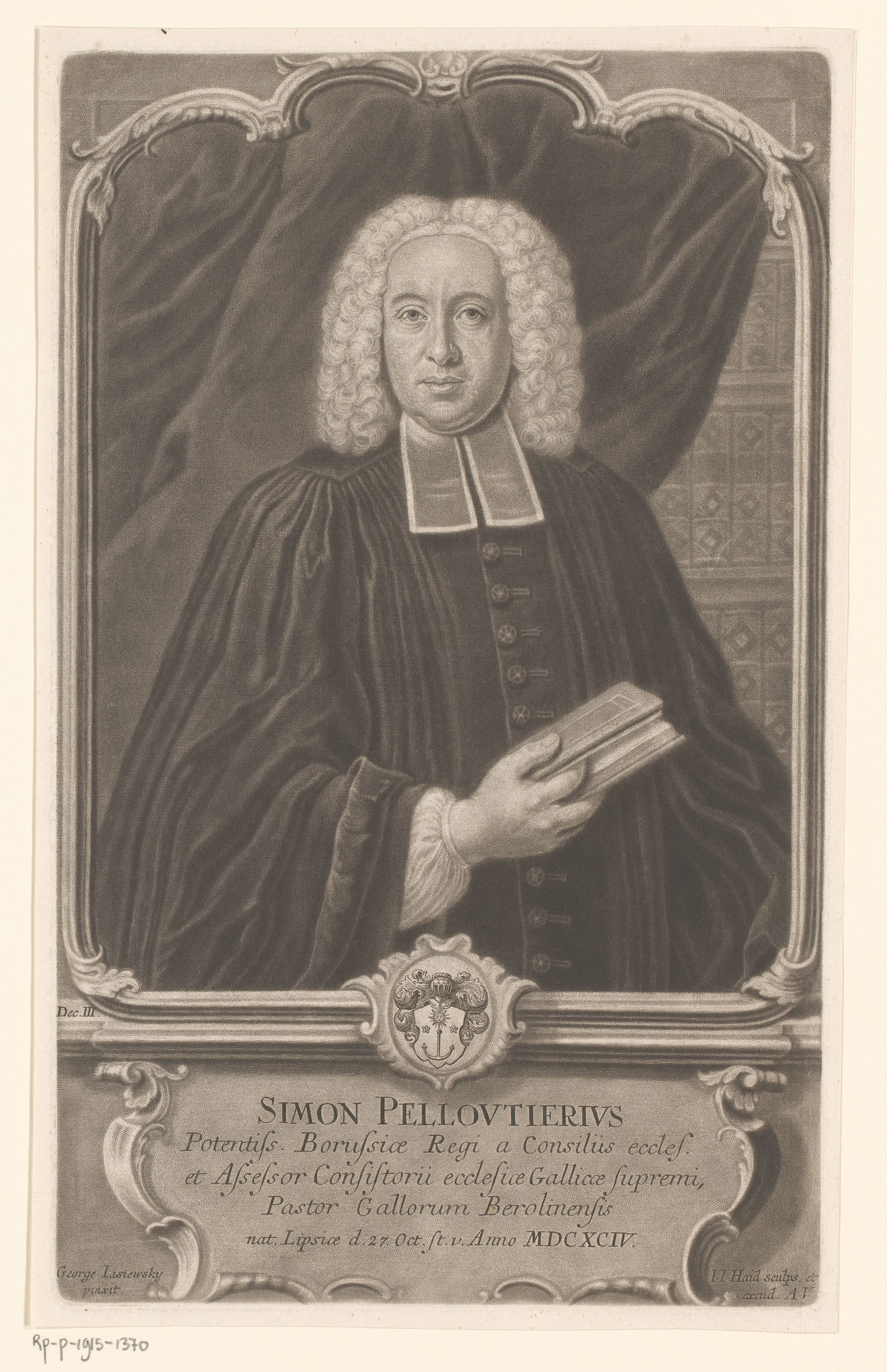
- Born: 27 October 1694; Leipzig
- Died: 2 October 1757; Berlin
- Occupations: Historian; librarian; writer

Simon Pelloutier (27 October 1694 – 3 October 1757) was a French historian, was born at Leipsic, Germany on 27 October 1694. His father, a merchant established at Lyons, had been driven from France by the revocation of the Edict of Nantes. Aided by an excellent memory and a strong desire to educate himself, he studied at Halle, at Berlin, and Geneva. Admitted to the evangelical ministry, he served the French churches of Buchholtz (1715), of Magdeburg (1719), and of Berlin (1725), where he was the colleague of Lentant. In 1743 he was elected member of the Academy of Sciences at Berlin, and was chosen for its librarian in 1745. He died at Berlin on 3 October 1757.

His principal work is, Histoire des Celtes, et particulièrement des Gaulois et des Germains, depuis Les Temps fabuleux, jusqu'à la Prise de Rome par les Gaulois (La Haye, 1740-1750, 2 vols. 12mo). This edition is full of faults; Chiniac de la Bastide has given a second, revised and enlarged after the MSS. of the author (Paris, 1771, 2 vols. 4to, or 8 vols. 12mo), which was translated into German by Purmann (Frankfort, 1777-1784, 3 vols. 8vo). "This work," says the Journal des Savants, "is very curious and agreeable in many respects; it is full of an extremely varied erudition. The author, not satisfied with proving what he advances, always accompanies his proofs with judicious reflections, from which he afterwards draws very extended conclusions, calculated to throw light upon the history and antiquities of all the different peoples of Europe." The editor has added to the Histoire des Celtes several dissertations by Pelloutier; among others the Discours sur les Galates, which gained for him in 1742 a prize from the French Academy of Inscriptions. See Brucker, Pinacotheca, dec. 3, No. 9; Formey, Eloges; Haag, La France Protestante.
