= Vianen (ship) =

Coordinates: 5.92°S 105.88°E

Vianen (Dutch pronunciation: [viˈjaːnə(n)]) was a 17th-century Dutch East Indies Company sailing ship, used to transport cargo between Europe and the Indies. She was shipwrecked but refloated on her first voyage, and shipwrecked and sunk on her second. Built at Amsterdam in 1626, she had a gross tonnage of 400.

== First voyage ==
Vianen departed Texel bound for Batavia on 19 March 1627, and arrived at the Cape of Good Hope on 16 July. Departing the Cape on 7 August, she arrived at Batavia on 8 October.

On 6 January she departed Batavia as part of a fleet of seven ships bound for Europe under the command of the outgoing Governor-General of the Dutch East Indies Pieter de Carpentier. Just as the fleet was leaving, however, a valuable cargo arrived at Batavia from China, so Vianen was held back to be loaded. She was then sent to catch up with the main fleet, but had been loaded too hastily, and had to return to port to have her load balanced by the addition of 5000 ingots of copper.

When Vianen finally departed Batavia again on 20 January, the monsoon had set in, preventing her from taking the usual route through the Sunda Strait. Instead, the captain, Gerrit Frederikszoon de Witt, was ordered to set a course through the Strait of Balamboan. Strong head winds then drove Vianen so far south that she ran aground in the vicinity of Barrow Island on the northwest coast of Australia. The crew were "forced to throw overboard 8 to 10 lasts of pepper and a quantity of copper, upon which through God's mercy, she got off again without further damage."

On returning north, de Witt charted the northwest coast about as far as the present-day location of Port Hedland. This part of the coast would later appear on maps as "G.F. de Wits Landt" or "de Wits Landt" ("de Witt's Land"). The crew also sighted Indigenous Australians in the vicinity of present-day Roebourne; this is believed to be the first European sighting of Indigenous Australians in Western Australia.

Vianen arrived at the Cape of Good Hope on 24 May. She departed on 1 June, and arrived at her destination, Goeree, Zeeland, on 8 November.

== Second voyage ==
Vianen departed Texel for Batavia on 7 May 1629 and arrived at the Cape of Good Hope on 27 August, staying there until 12 September. On 14 November 1629, she was shipwrecked and sunk in the Sunda Strait.

== General references ==
- Heeres, Jan Ernst (1899). The Part Borne by the Dutch in the Discovery of Australia 1606-1765 (in Dutch and English). Leiden, London: Brill Publishers. hdl:2027/njp.32101073851337. LCCN 05012045. OCLC 13214159. OL 52349613M. Wikidata Q133908667.
