= Johann Michael von Loën =

German writer and statesman

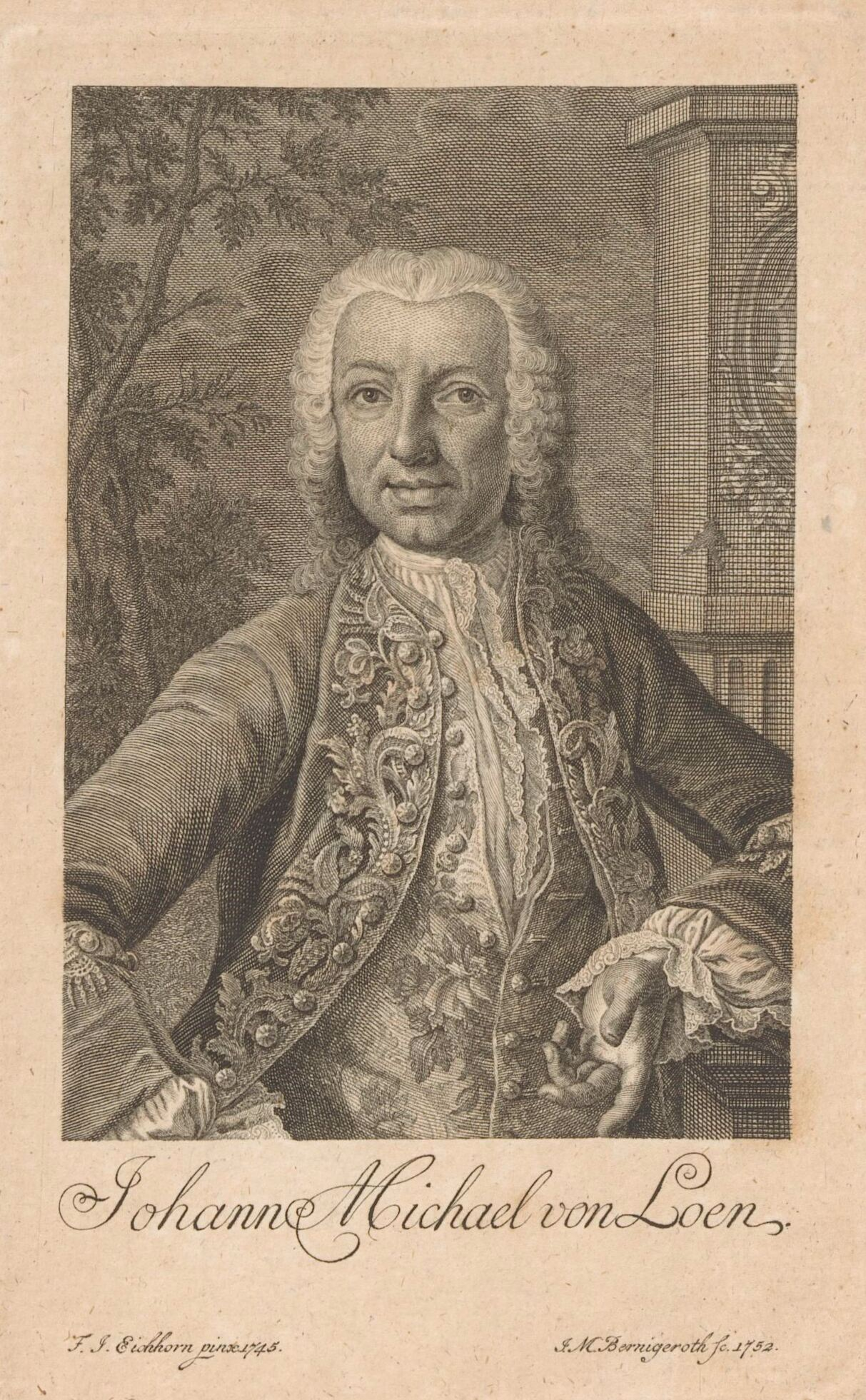
- Born: December 11, 1694
- Died: July 24, 1776 (aged 81)

Johann Michael von Loën (11 December 1694 in Frankfurt am Main - 24 July 1776 in Lingen, Ems) was a German writer and statesman. His The Honest Man at Court 1748, was translated into English in 1997. He was great uncle of Goethe, born in 1749.
