= 1696 =

1696 in various calendars
- Gregorian calendar: 1696; MDCXCVI
- Ab urbe condita: 2449
- Armenian calendar: 1145; ԹՎ ՌՃԽԵ
- Assyrian calendar: 6446
- Balinese saka calendar: 1617–1618
- Bengali calendar: 1102–1103
- Berber calendar: 2646
- English Regnal year: 8 Will. 3 – 9 Will. 3
- Buddhist calendar: 2240
- Burmese calendar: 1058
- Byzantine calendar: 7204–7205
- Chinese calendar: 乙亥年 (Wood Pig); 4393 or 4186 — to — 丙子年 (Fire Rat); 4394 or 4187
- Coptic calendar: 1412–1413
- Discordian calendar: 2862
- Ethiopian calendar: 1688–1689
- Hebrew calendar: 5456–5457
- Hindu calendars
- Vikram Samvat: 1752–1753
- Shaka Samvat: 1617–1618
- Kali Yuga: 4796–4797
- Holocene calendar: 11696
- Igbo calendar: 696–697
- Iranian calendar: 1074–1075
- Islamic calendar: 1107–1108
- Japanese calendar: Genroku 9 (元禄９年)
- Javanese calendar: 1619–1620
- Julian calendar: Gregorian minus 10 days
- Korean calendar: 4029
- Minguo calendar: 216 before ROC 民前216年
- Nanakshahi calendar: 228
- Thai solar calendar: 2238–2239
- Tibetan calendar: ཤིང་མོ་ཕག་ལོ་ (female Wood-Boar); 1822 or 1441 or 669 — to — མེ་ཕོ་བྱི་བ་ལོ་ (male Fire-Rat); 1823 or 1442 or 670

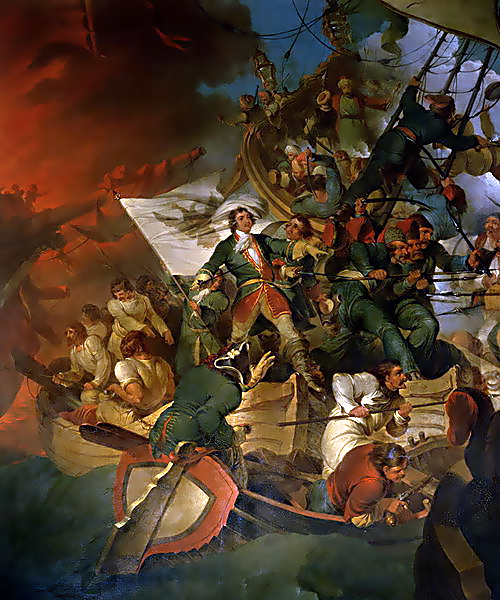
July 18: Russia captures the city of Azov from the Ottoman Empire.

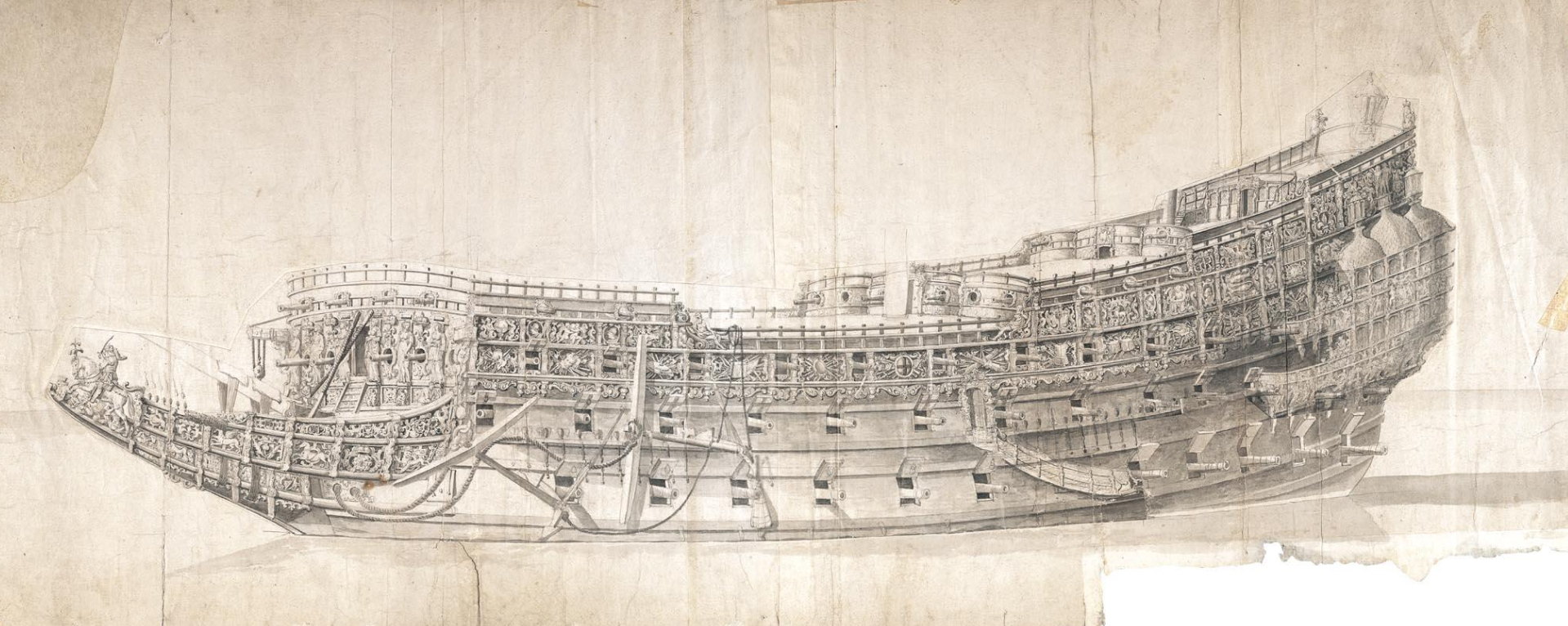
January 27: HMS Royal Sovereign accidentally burns.

1696 (MDCXCVI) was a leap year starting on Sunday of the Gregorian calendar and a leap year starting on Wednesday of the Julian calendar, the 1696th year of the Common Era (CE) and Anno Domini (AD) designations, the 696th year of the 2nd millennium, the 96th year of the 17th century, and the 7th year of the 1690s decade. As of the start of 1696, the Gregorian calendar was 10 days ahead of the Julian calendar, which remained in localized use until 1923.

== Events ==
=== January–March ===
- January 21 – The Recoinage Act, passed by the Parliament of England to pull counterfeit silver coins out of circulation, becomes law.
- January 27 – In England, the ship HMS Royal Sovereign (formerly Sovereign of the Seas) catches fire and burns at Chatham, after 57 years of service.
- January 31 – In the Netherlands, undertakers revolt after funeral reforms in Amsterdam.
- January – Colley Cibber's play Love's Last Shift is first performed in London.
- February 8 (January 29 old style) – Peter the Great, who had jointly reigned since 1682 with his mentally ill older half-brother Tsar Ivan V, becomes the sole Tsar of Russia when Ivan dies at the age of 29.
- February 15 – A plot to ambush and assassinate King William III of England in order to restore King James and the House of Stuart to the throne is foiled when the king cancels his usual plan to return from a hunting trip by way of the road between Turnham Green and Brentford. The king's guard is alerted by the Earl of Portland, William Bentinck, who had been approached on February 13 by Sir Thomas Prendergast.
- February 23 – A royal proclamation is issued to arrest suspected Jacobite conspirators who had plotted the assassination of King William III, including gunman Robert Charnock and organizers George Barclay, and Sir John Fenwick. Barclay eludes capture, but Charnock and Fenwick are executed.
- March 7 – King William III of England departs from the Netherlands.
- March 9 – Spanish missionaries in the province of Santa Fe de Nuevo México in North America first learn of plans for a revolt among the Pueblo Indians and send warnings to the governor, asking for Spanish troops. The uprising begins on June 4.
- March 16 – The Dutch bombard Givet during the Nine Years' War.
- March 18 – Robert Charnock, who had been arrested for the Jacobite plot to kill King William is hanged at the Tower of London.

=== April–June ===
- April 23 – Russo-Turkish War (1686–1700): Russia begins the second of the Azov campaigns (1695–96).
- April – A fire destroys the Gra Bet (Left Quarter) of Gondar, the capital of Ethiopia. The fire starts "in the house of a prostitute" and destroys many buildings, including the churches of St. George, Takla Haymanot and Iyasu.
- May 1 – A partial solar eclipse is visible in western Canada and Greenland.
- May 16 – A total lunar eclipse is visible in western Europe and Africa.
- May 31 – John Salomonsz is elected chief of Sint Eustatius in the Caribbean Netherlands.
- June 4 – A second Pueblo Revolt occurs in Santa Fe de Nuevo México. The Tiwas of Taos and Picuris, the Tewas of San Ildefonso and Nambe, the Tanos of Jemez and San Cristobal, and the Keres of Santo Domingo and Cochiti attack during the full moon and kill 21 Spanish civilians and five priests.
- June 12 – China's Kangxi Emperor leads troops in the Battle of Jao Modo, about 37 miles (60 km) from the modern Mongolian capital, Ulan Bator, and defeats 5,000 Mongolian troops of the Dzungar Khanate under the command of Galdan Boshugtu Khan.
- June 17
  - The throne of the Polish–Lithuanian Commonwealth becomes vacant with the death of Jan Sobieski, prompting a competition between Friedrich Augustus, Elector of Saxony and Prince François Louis of France to compete under the commonwealth's "Golden Liberty" system for an elective monarchy of the new king by the nobility. Jerzy Albrecht Denhoff, the Grand Chancellor, remains the head of the Polish-Lithuanian government during the vacancy of the ceremonial throne.
  - Seven French ships attack five Dutch ships escorting a convoy of 112 merchant ships in the Battle of Dogger Bank.

=== July–September ===
- July 18 – Azov campaign: The Russian fleet occupies Azov at the mouth of the river Don.
- August 13 – The Dutch state of Drenthe makes William III of Orange its Stadtholder.
- August 22 – Forces of the Republic of Venice and the Ottoman Empire clash near Andros.
- August 29 – King Louis XIV of France and Victor Amadeus, Duke of Savoy, sign the Treaty of Turin, ending Savoy's involvement in the Nine Years' War.
- September 8 – The Parliament of Scotland passes the Education Act 1696, providing for locally funded, Church-supervised schools to be established in every parish in Scotland.
- September 11 – England's Royal Navy scuttles and deliberately sinks its 32-gun battleship HMS Sapphire in Bay Bulls Harbour in Newfoundland, rather than let it be captured by the French Navy following a disastrous battle.
- September 17 – On Canada's Hudson Bay, the English Navy recaptures the York Factory from France, three years after the French had captured it, and renamed the site "Fort Bourbon".

=== October–December ===
- October 7 – The Convention of Vigevano is signed, bringing a general ceasefire in Italy and an end to the Nine Years' War between France and the remaining members of the Grand Alliance.
- October 20 – The Imperial Russian Navy is founded on the recommendation of Tsar Peter the Great and approval by the Russian Duma.
- November 9 – A total lunar eclipse is visible in North and South America.
- November 12 – Hand in Hand Fire & Life Insurance Society, as predecessor to Aviva, is founded in England.
- November 21 – John Vanbrugh's play The Relapse is first performed in London.
- November 25 – In England, the House of Commons approves the bill of attainder to convict Sir John Fenwick of high treason for plotting to lead the assassination of and coup d'état against King William III, on its third and final reading, voting 187 to 161 in favor of conviction. The measure then moves to the House of Lords.
- November 30 – Pierre Le Moyne d'Iberville captures and destroys St. John's, Newfoundland after a three-day siege.
- December 7 – Connecticut Route 108, one of Connecticut's oldest highways is laid-out to Trumbull.
- December 19 – Jean-François Regnard's verse comedy Le Joueur ("The Gamester") premieres in Paris.
- December 23 – By a vote of 66 to 60, the English House of Lords approves the bill of attainder for the conviction of Sir John Fenwick for high treason. Fenwick is beheaded on January 28, 1697.
- December 24 – The Inquisition in Portugal carries out the sentence of burning at the stake against several Marrano Jews in Évora.

=== Date unknown ===
- The Great Famine of 1695–1697 wipes out almost a third of the population of Finland, while the Great Famine of Estonia (1695–97) takes out a fifth of the population of Estonia; and the "seven ill years" of famine in Scotland are ongoing.
- Polish replaces Ruthenian as an official language of the Grand Duchy of Lithuania.
- Abington, Pennsylvania, is settled.
- William Penn offers an elaborate plan for intercolonial cooperation largely in trade, defense, and criminal matters.
- Edward Lloyd probably begins publication of Lloyd's News, a predecessor of Lloyd's List, in London.
- Window tax was introduced in England and Wales and remained in force until 1851.
- A New Theory of the Earth, a book by William Whiston, is published and is well received by intellectuals of the day.
- The Bank of Scotland becomes the first bank in Europe to successfully issue paper currency.

== Births ==
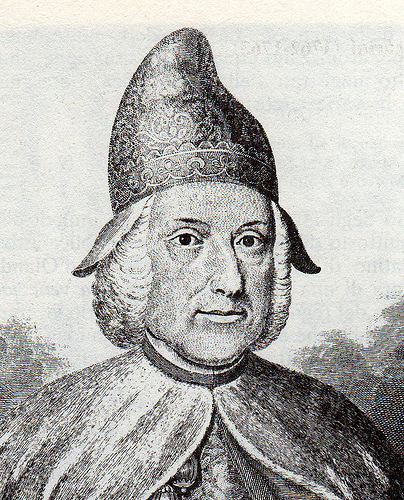
Marco Foscarini born 4 February

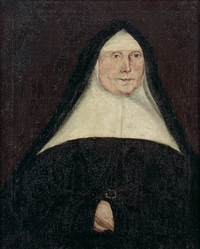
Esther Wheelwright born 10 April

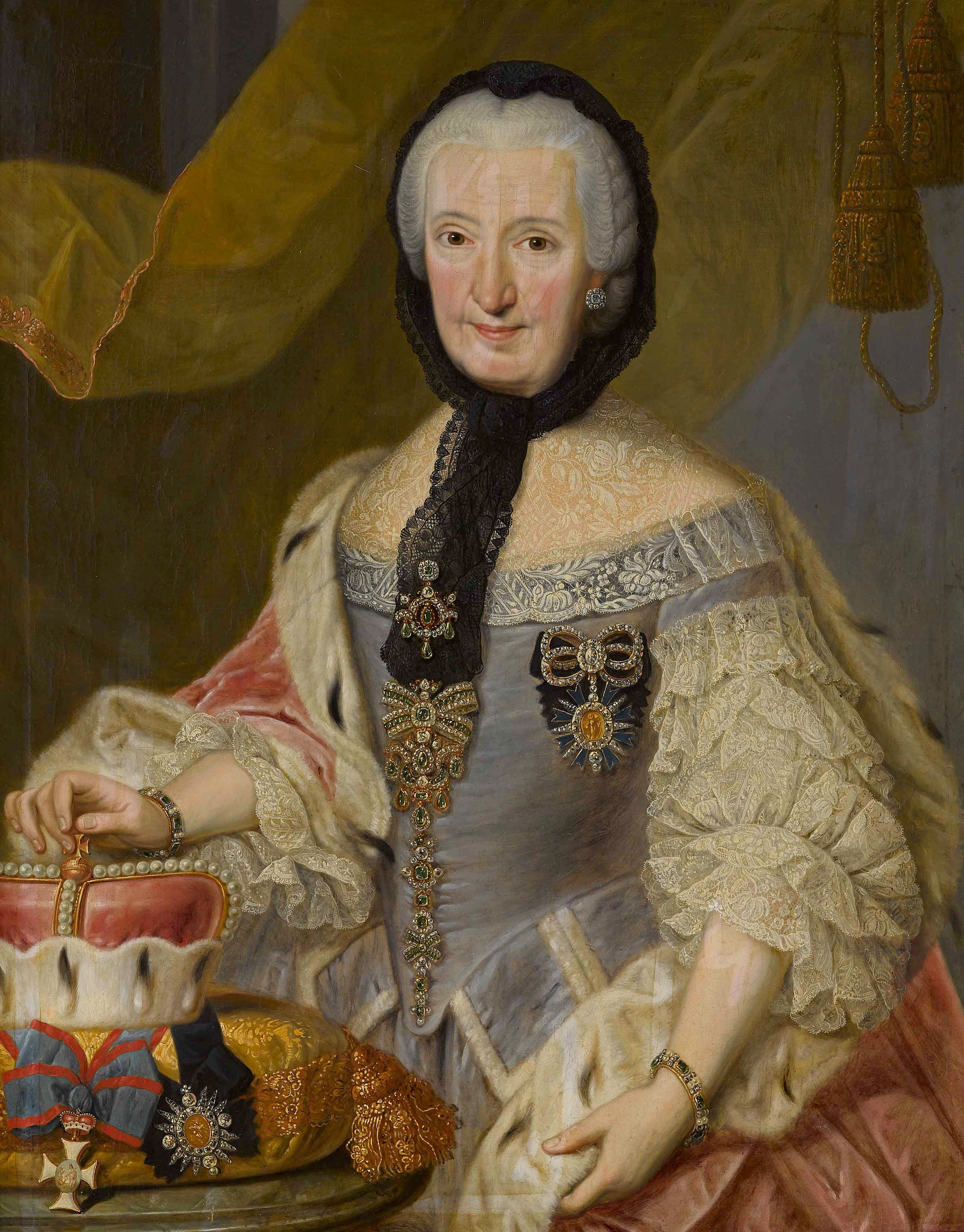
Countess Palatine Franziska Christine of Sulzbach born 16 May

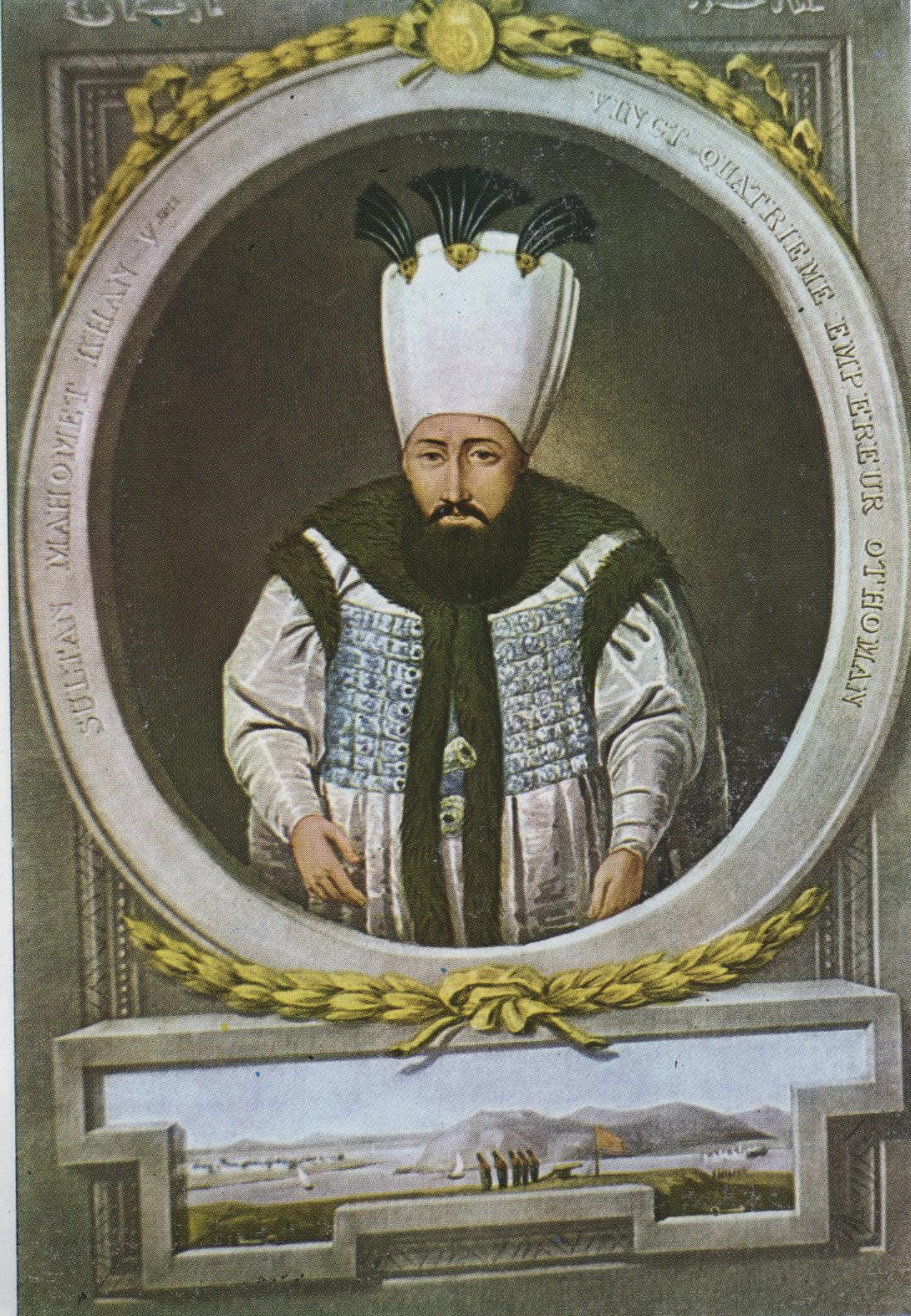
Mahmud I born 2 August

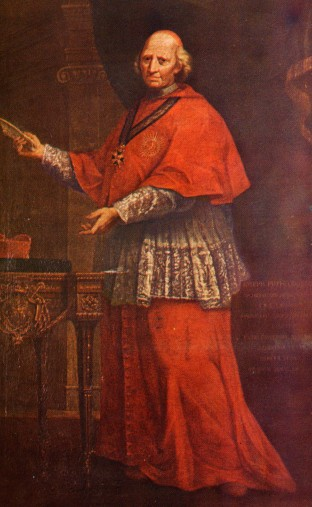
Giuseppe Pozzobonelli born 11 August

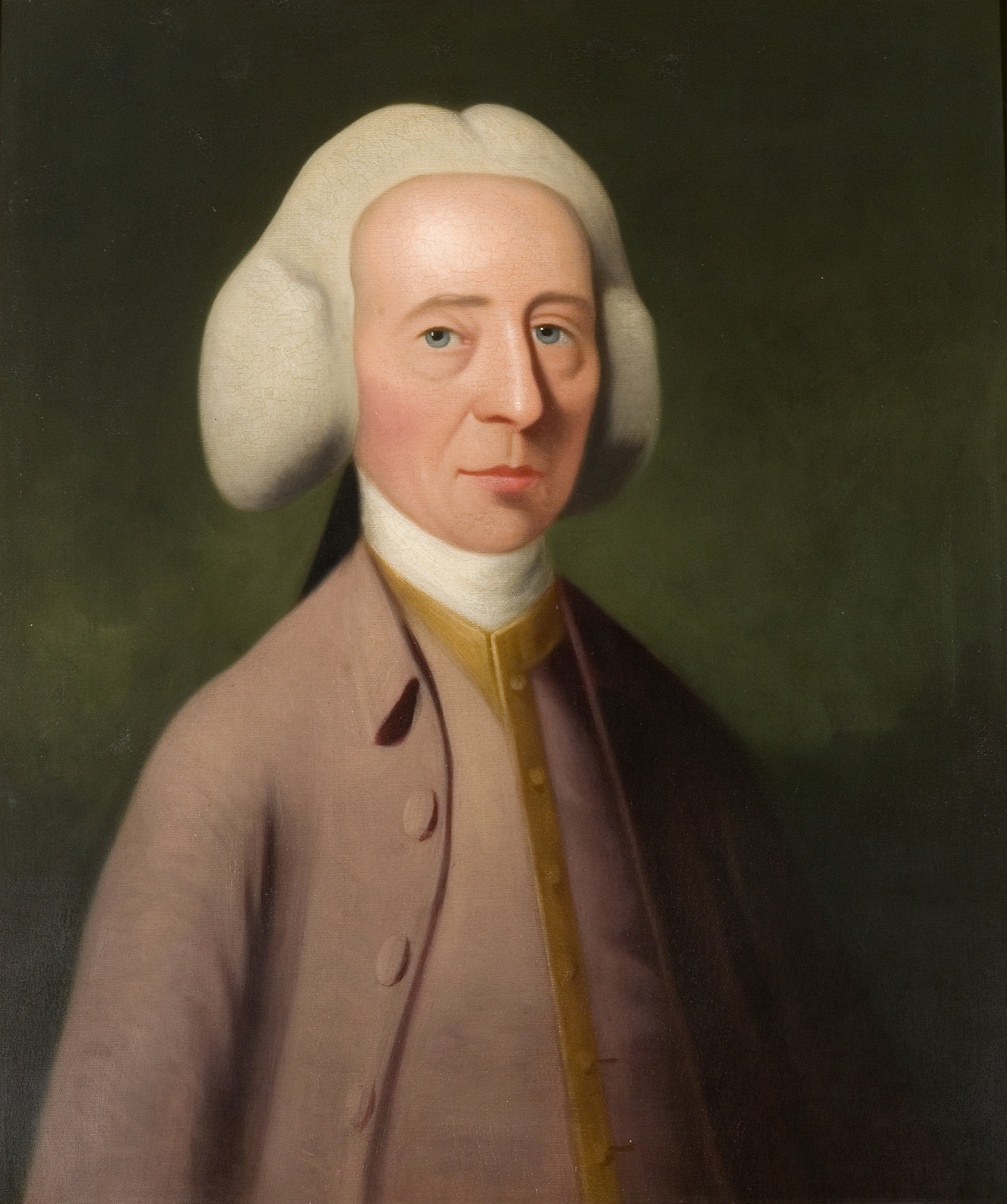
Charles Gray (Colchester MP) born 20 September

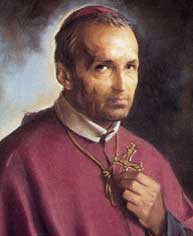
Alphonsus Liguori born 27 September

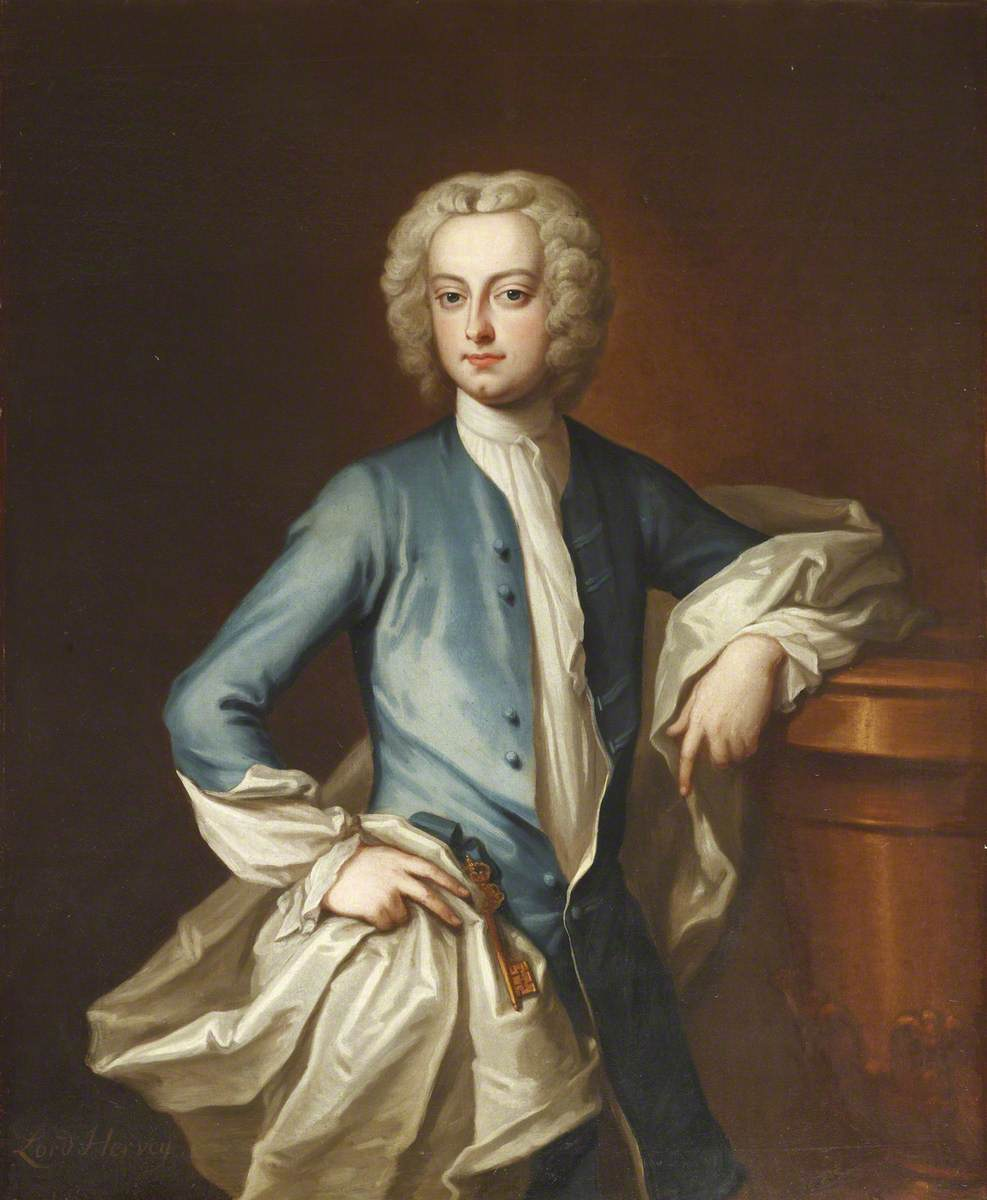
John Hervey, 2nd Baron Hervey born 13 October

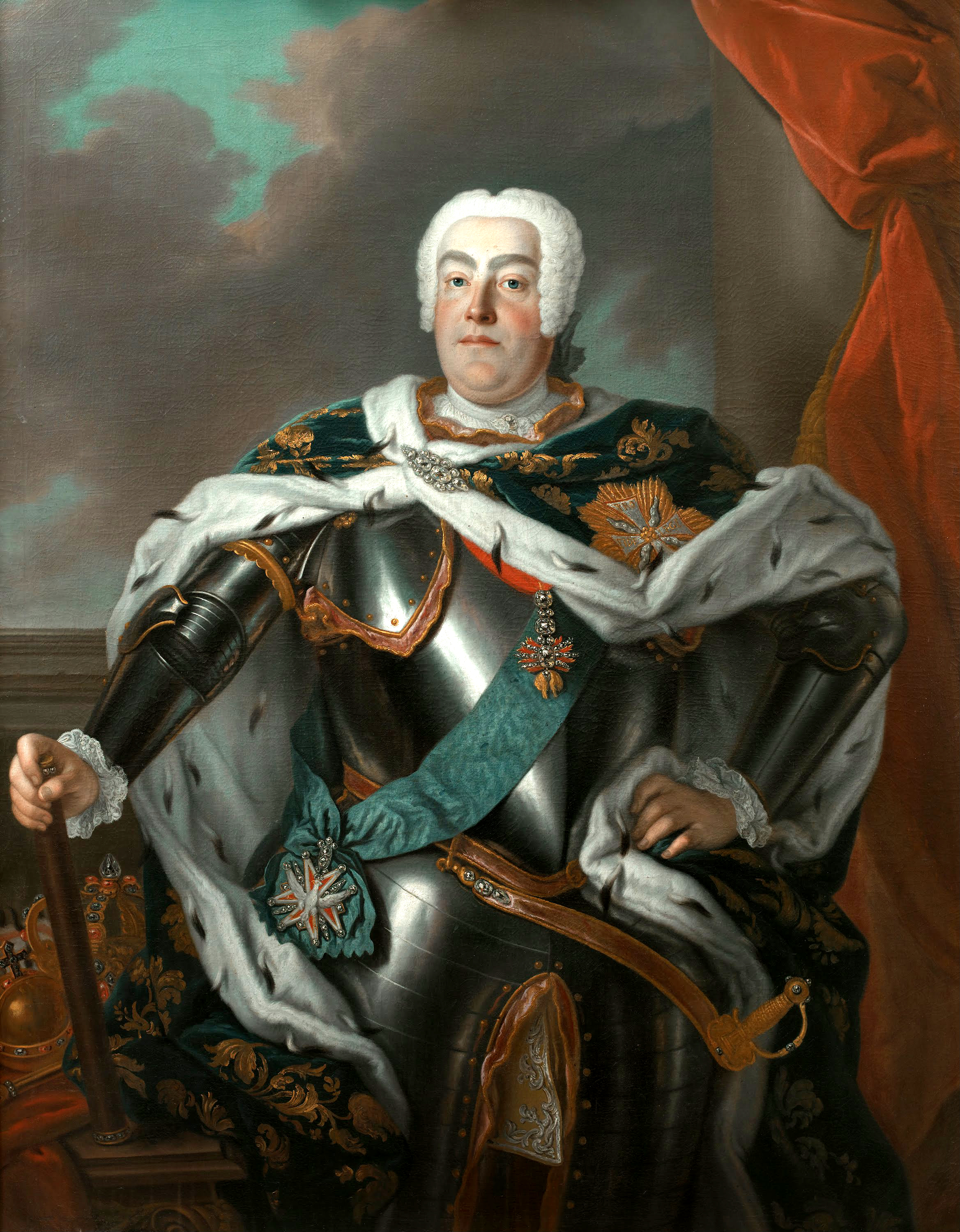
Augustus III of Poland born 17 October

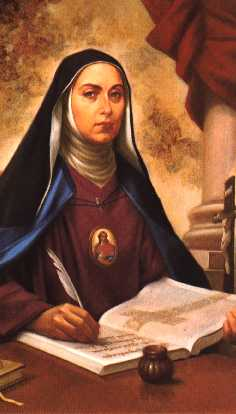
Giulia Crostarosa born 31 October

Conrad Weiser born 2 November

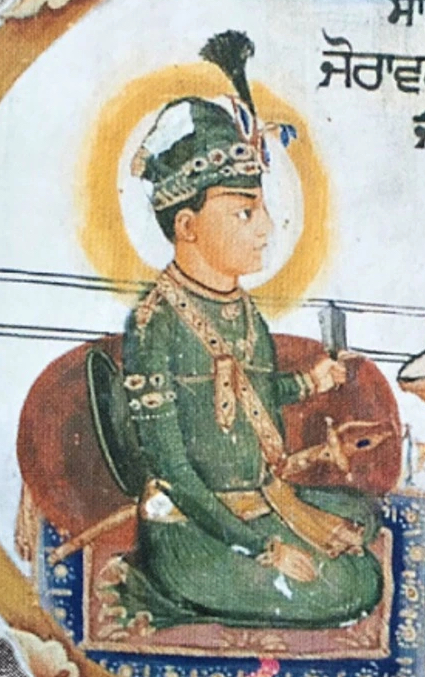
Zorawar Singh (Sikhism) born 17 November

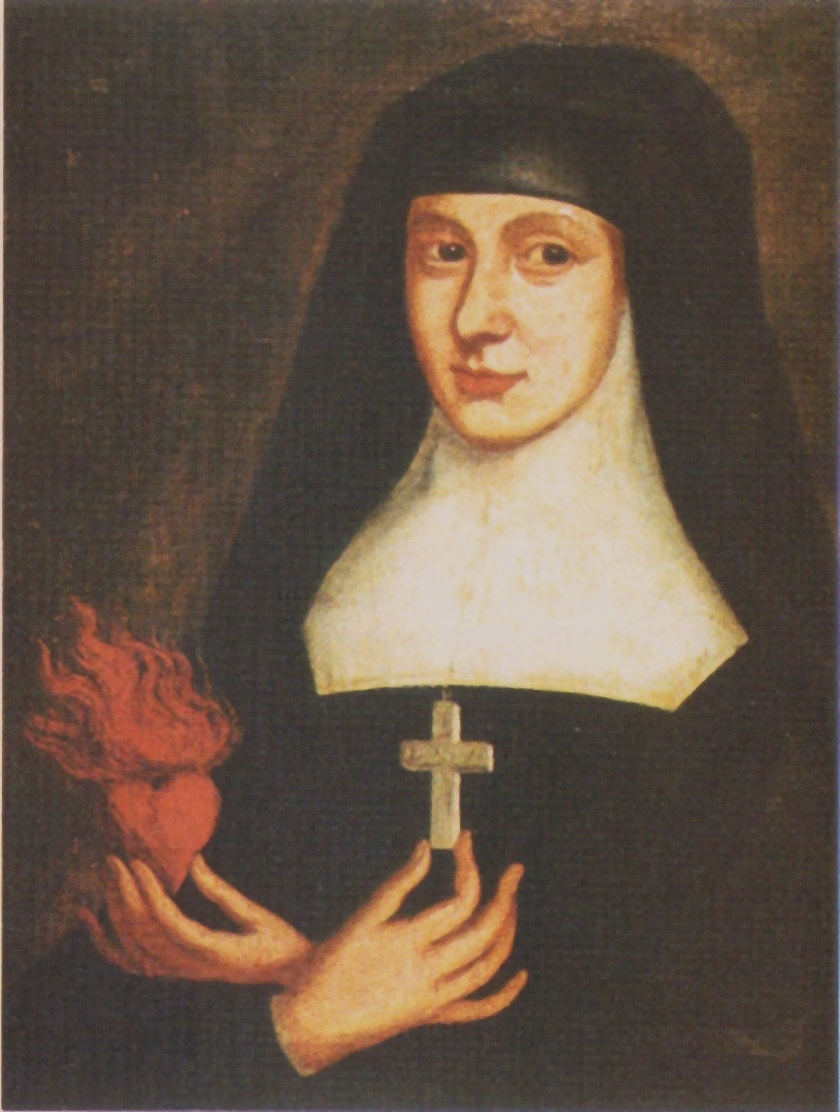
Anne-Madeleine Remuzat born 29 November

=== January–March ===
- January 5 – Giuseppe Galli Bibiena, Italian artist (d. 1757)
- January 8 – Étienne Parrocel, French painter (d. 1775)
- January 11 – Frederick William, Prince of Solms-Braunfels (d. 1761)
- January 14
  - Troiano Acquaviva d'Aragona, Italian cardinal (d. 1747)
  - John Hippisley, English actor and theatre manager (1696–1748) (d. 1748)
- January 17
  - Jean de Beaurain, French geographer (d. 1771)
  - Laurent Delvaux, Flemish sculptor (d. 1778)
  - Ambrose Madison, American planter and politician (d. 1732)
- January 18
  - Ludovico Calini, Italian cardinal (d. 1782)
  - Sebastian Klotz, German violin maker (d. 1775)
- January 22 – Johann Jakob Brucker, German historian of philosophy (d. 1770)
- January 31 – John Wigan, British physician and author (1696–1739) (d. 1739)
- February 2 – Juan José Eguiara y Eguren, Mexican bishop (d. 1763)
- February 3 – Caspar Wistar, American glassmaker (d. 1752)
- February 4 – Marco Foscarini, 117th Doge of Venice (d. 1763)
- February 10 – Johann Melchior Molter, German composer (d. 1765)
- February 17 – Ernst Gottlieb Baron, German composer (d. 1760)
- February 22 – Henrietta Polyxena of Vasaborg, Swedish countess (d. 1777)
- February 25 – Jean-Philippe-René de La Bléterie, French historian and translator (d. 1772)
- February 29 – Esprit Antoine Blanchard, French baroque composer (d. 1770)
- March 5 – Giovanni Battista Tiepolo, Italian painter (d. 1770)
- March 6 – Joseph Anton Feuchtmayer, German sculptor (d. 1770)
- March 10 – John Campbell, 3rd Earl of Breadalbane and Holland, Scottish nobleman, diplomat and politician (d. 1782)
- March 13 – Armand de Vignerot du Plessis, French diplomat (d. 1788)
- March 15 – François-Arnoul Poisson de Roinville, French actor (d. 1753)
- March 17 – Lajos Batthyány, Hungarian palatine (d. 1765)
- March 18 – Domenico Maria Fratta, Italian painter and draughtsman (d. 1763)
- March 21 – Pierre Février, French composer, organist, and harpsichordist (d. 1760)
- March 23 – Johann Erhard Kapp, German author and historian (d. 1756)
- March 27
  - Antoine Court, French Huguenot minister (d. 1760)
  - Charles Ingram, British army officer (d. 1748)
- March 30
  - Ayşe Sultan, daughter of Ottoman Sultan Mustafa II (d. 1752)
  - John Worsley, scholar (d. 1767)

=== April–June ===
- April 2 – Francesca Cuzzoni, Italian operatic soprano (d. 1778)
- April 3 – Diego Bernardo de Peredo y Navarrete, Mexican Roman Catholic clergyman, bishop of Yucatán (d. 1774)
- April 6
  - Charles Beauclerk, 2nd Duke of St Albans, British politician (d. 1751)
  - Richard Grey, priest (d. 1771)
- April 8 – Wichmann Lastrop, Hamburg merchant and grand burgher (d. 1747)
- April 10 – Esther Wheelwright, Ursuline nun (d. 1780)
- April 12 – Joseph Atwell, English cleric (d. 1768)
- April 14 – Princess Antoinette of Brunswick-Wolfenbüttel, German duchess (d. 1762)
- April 15 – François Morellon la Cave, French engraver (d. 1768)
- April 19 – Burchard Mauchart, German anatomist and surgeon (d. 1751)
- April 20 – Curtis Barnett, Royal Navy officer (d. 1746)
- April 21 – Francesco de Mura, Italian painter (d. 1782)
- April 26 – Michał Fryderyk Czartoryski, Polish noble (d. 1775)
- April 27 – John Lyon, 5th Earl of Strathmore and Kinghorne, Scottish Earl (d. 1715)
- May 2 – Thomas Chester, British Member of Parliament (d. 1763)
- May 4 – Louis de Cormontaigne, French engineer (d. 1752)
- May 7 – Eleonore Wilhelmine of Anhalt-Köthen, German noblewoman (d. 1726)
- May 11 – George Crowle, British Whig MP (d. 1754)
- May 16 – Countess Palatine Franziska Christine of Sulzbach, Abess of Thorn and Abbess of Essen (d. 1776)
- May 22 – William Rathbone II, British businessman (d. 1746)
- May 23 – Johann Caspar Vogler, German composer (d. 1763)
- May 28 – Giovanni Lorenzo Berti, Italian theologian (d. 1766)
- June 5 – Peregrine Hopson, British Army general (d. 1759)
- June 6 – Peter Spaak, Swedish Protestant reformer (d. 1759)
- June 9 – Shivaji II, Ruler of Maratha Empire (d. 1726)
- June 11 – James Francis Edward Keith, Scottish soldier and Prussian field marshal (d. 1758)
- June 14 – Al-Mansur al-Husayn II, imam (d. 1748)
- June 18 – Friedrich August von Harrach-Rohrau, plenipotentiary minister of the Austrian Netherlands (d. 1749)
- June 21 – John Gibbes, English military officer in the province of Carolina (d. 1764)
- June 27 – William Pepperrell, English colonial soldier (d. 1759)

=== July–September ===
- July 14
  - Buenaventura Blanco y Elguero, Roman Catholic bishop (d. 1764)
  - William Oldys, English antiquarian and bibliographer, Norroy king-at-arms (d. 1761)
- July 22 – Eric Julius Biörner, state official and a scholar of ancient history (d. 1750)
- July 24 – Benning Wentworth, Colonial governor of New Hampshire (d. 1770)
- July 27 – Samuel Whittemore, American farmer and oldest known colonial combatant of the American Revolution (d. 1793)
- July 28 – Élisabeth Bégon, French writer (d. 1755)
- July 31 – Dumont de Montigny, French colonial officer, farmer, and author (d. 1760)
- August 2 – Mahmud I, Sultan of the Ottoman Empire from 1730 to 1754 (d. 1754)
- August 4 – Christian August I, Duke of Schleswig-Holstein-Sonderburg-Augustenburg (d. 1754)
- August 6 – Johann Gregor Herold, German painter (d. 1775)
- August 7 – Samuel Waldo, American businessman, land speculator, and militia general (d. 1759)
- August 8 – Jean Girard, Canadian musician (d. 1765)
- August 9 – Joseph Wenzel I, Prince of Liechtenstein, Austrian marshall (d. 1772)
- August 11 – Giuseppe Pozzobonelli, Archbishop of Milan (d. 1783)
- August 12 – Maurice Greene, English composer and organist (d. 1755)
- August 16 – Marc-Pierre de Voyer de Paulmy d'Argenson, French politician (d. 1764)
- August 17 – John Thomas, Bishop of Winchester, of Salisbury and of Peterborough (d. 1781)
- September 7 – Christoph Friedrich von Lattorf, German military personnel (d. 1762)
- September 8 – Basil Hamilton, British Member of Parliament (d. 1742)
- September 13
  - Johann Caspar Bagnato, German architect (d. 1757)
  - Christoph Ludwig von Stille, Prussian Major General (d. 1752)
- September 14 – Batty Langley, British garden designer (d. 1751)
- September 17 – Eunice Kanenstenhawi Williams, Native American captive (d. 1785)
- September 18 – Thomas Hunt, English academic, Oxford Laudian Professor of Arabic (d. 1774)
- September 20 – Charles Gray, British politician (d. 1782)
- September 25
  - Sir Archibald Grant, 2nd Baronet, Scottish politician (d. 1778)
  - Marie Anne de Vichy-Chamrond, marquise du Deffand, French salon-holder (d. 1780)
- September 27
  - Sir John St Aubyn, 3rd Baronet, British politician (d. 1744)
  - Hendrik Carré II, Dutch painter (d. 1775)
  - Alphonsus Liguori, Italian founder of the Redemptorist Order (d. 1787)
- September 30 – Jean-François de La Clue-Sabran, French admiral of the Seven Years' War (d. 1764)

=== October–December ===
- October 2
  - John Blackwood, British Member of Parliament (d. 1777)
  - Ann Smith Franklin, American colonial newspaper printer and publisher (d. 1763)
- October 10 – Chen Hongmou, Chinese official and philosopher (d. 1771)
- October 13 – John Hervey, 2nd Baron Hervey, English courtier, political writer and memoirist (d. 1743)
- October 14 – Samuel Johnson, President of Columbia University (d. 1772)
- October 17 – Augustus III of Poland, King of Poland, Elector of Saxony (d. 1763)
- October 20 – Ludwig, Prince of Hohenlohe-Langenburg, Count and later Prince of Hohenlohe-Langenburg (d. 1765)
- October 21
  - Charles Louis, Count of Marsan, French noble (d. 1755)
  - John Manners, 3rd Duke of Rutland, English nobleman (d. 1779)
  - James Fitz-James Stuart, 2nd Duke of Berwick, Jacobite and Spanish general and noble (d. 1738)
- October 28 – Maurice de Saxe, Marshal General of France (d. 1750)
- October 31 – Giulia Crostarosa, Italian catholic nun and foundress (d. 1755)
- November 1 – Karl Ferdinand von Königsegg-Erps, Belgian politician (d. 1759)
- November 2
  - Louise Adélaïde de Bourbon, French noble (d. 1750)
  - Conrad Weiser, Pennsylvania's interpreter and emissary to the Native Americans (d. 1760)
- November 7 – Heinrich von Manteuffel, German military personnel (d. 1778)
- November 11 – Andrea Zani, Italian violinist and composer (d. 1757)
- November 12 – Theophilus Hastings, 9th Earl of Huntingdon, English noble (d. 1746)
- November 17
  - Samuel Cluckston, Connecticut politician (d. 1751)
  - Zorawar Singh, Sikh martyr (d. 1705)
- November 19 – Louis Tocqué, French painter (d. 1772)
- November 22 – Tokugawa Muneharu, A daimyo in the mid-Edo period (d. 1764)
- November 29 – Anne-Madeleine Remuzat, French nun recognized as venerable (d. 1730)
- December 1 – Francis Burton, Irish politician (d. 1744)
- December 2 – Daniel de Superville, ⁭founded University of Erlangen-Nuremberg (d. 1773)
- December 13
  - Egid Verhelst the Elder, Flemish sculptor (d. 1749)
  - Safiye Sultan, daughter of Ottoman Sultan Mustafa II (d. 1778)
- December 22 – James Oglethorpe, English general and founder of the state of Georgia as a colony (d. 1785)
- December 25 – Prince Johann Ernst of Saxe-Weimar, composer (d. 1715)
- December 31 – Thomas Winnington, British politician (d. 1746)
- date unknown
  - William Beverley, American legislator, civil servant, planter, and landowner (d. 1756)
  - Christine Kirch, German astronomer (d. 1782)
  - Carlo Zimech, Maltese priest and painter (d. 1766)

== Deaths ==
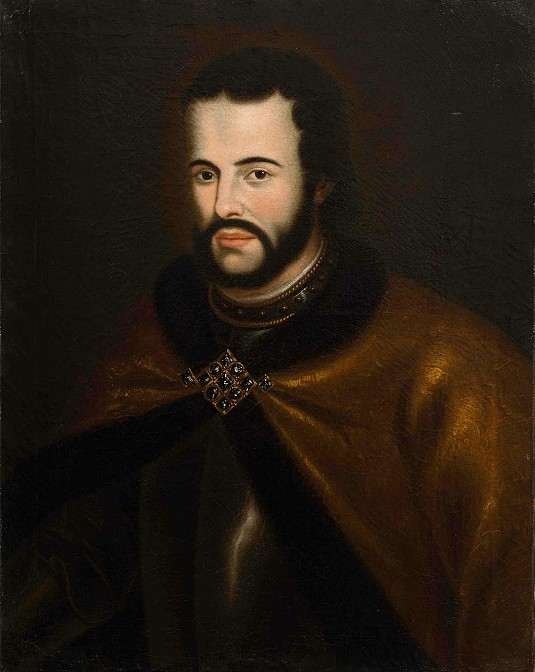
Ivan V of Russia died 8 February

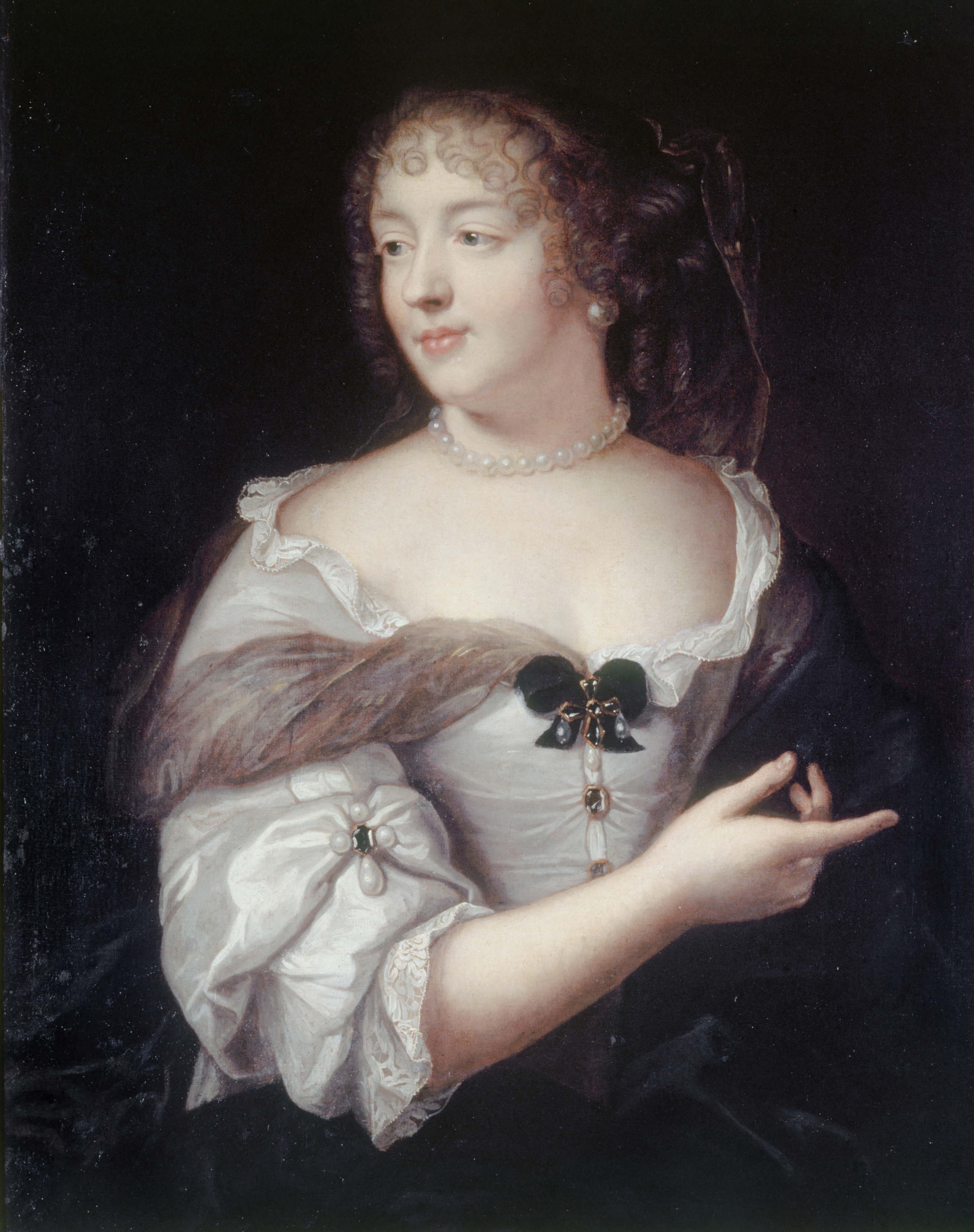
Marie de Rabutin-Chantal, marquise de Sévigné died 17 April

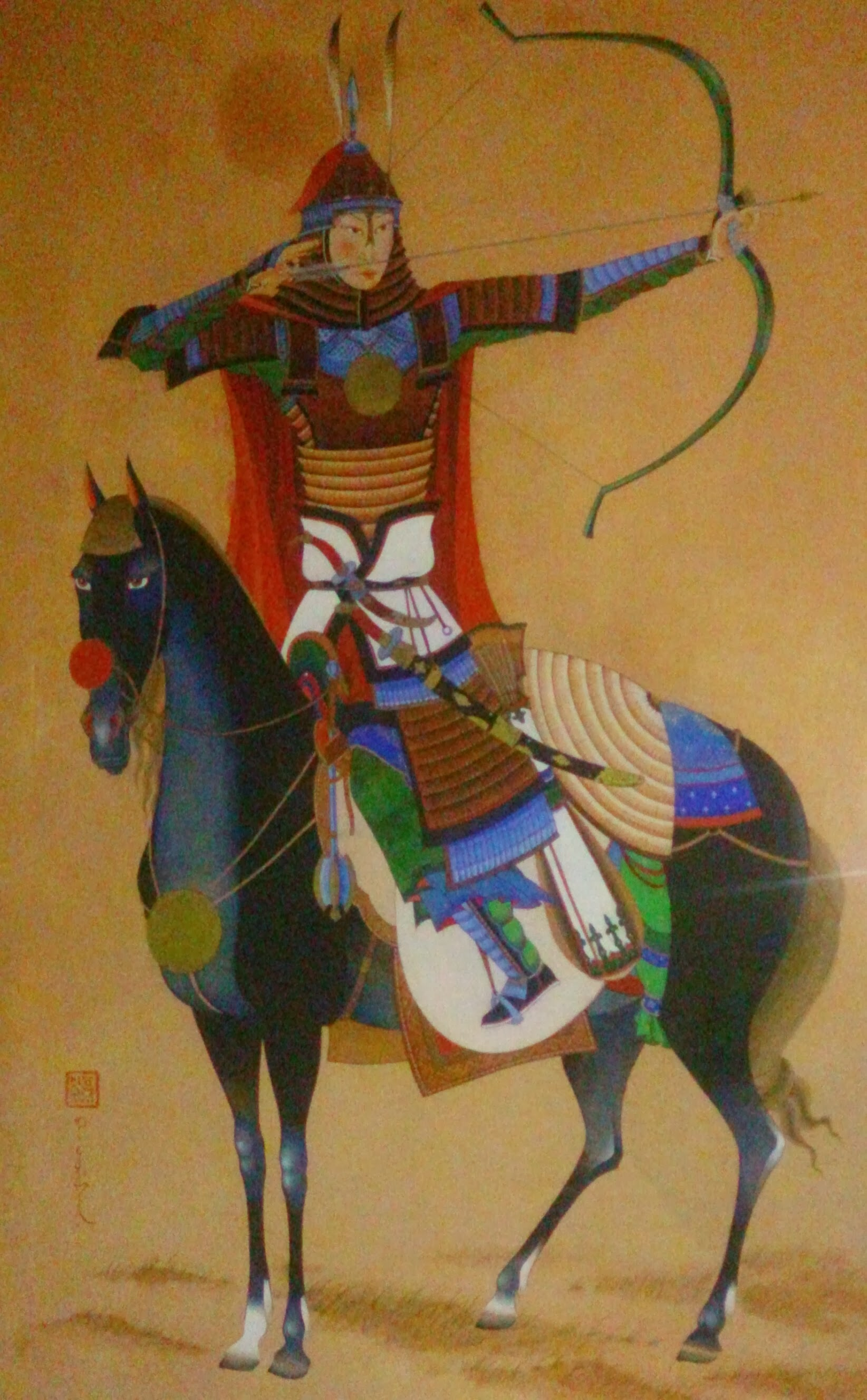
Queen Anu died 12 June

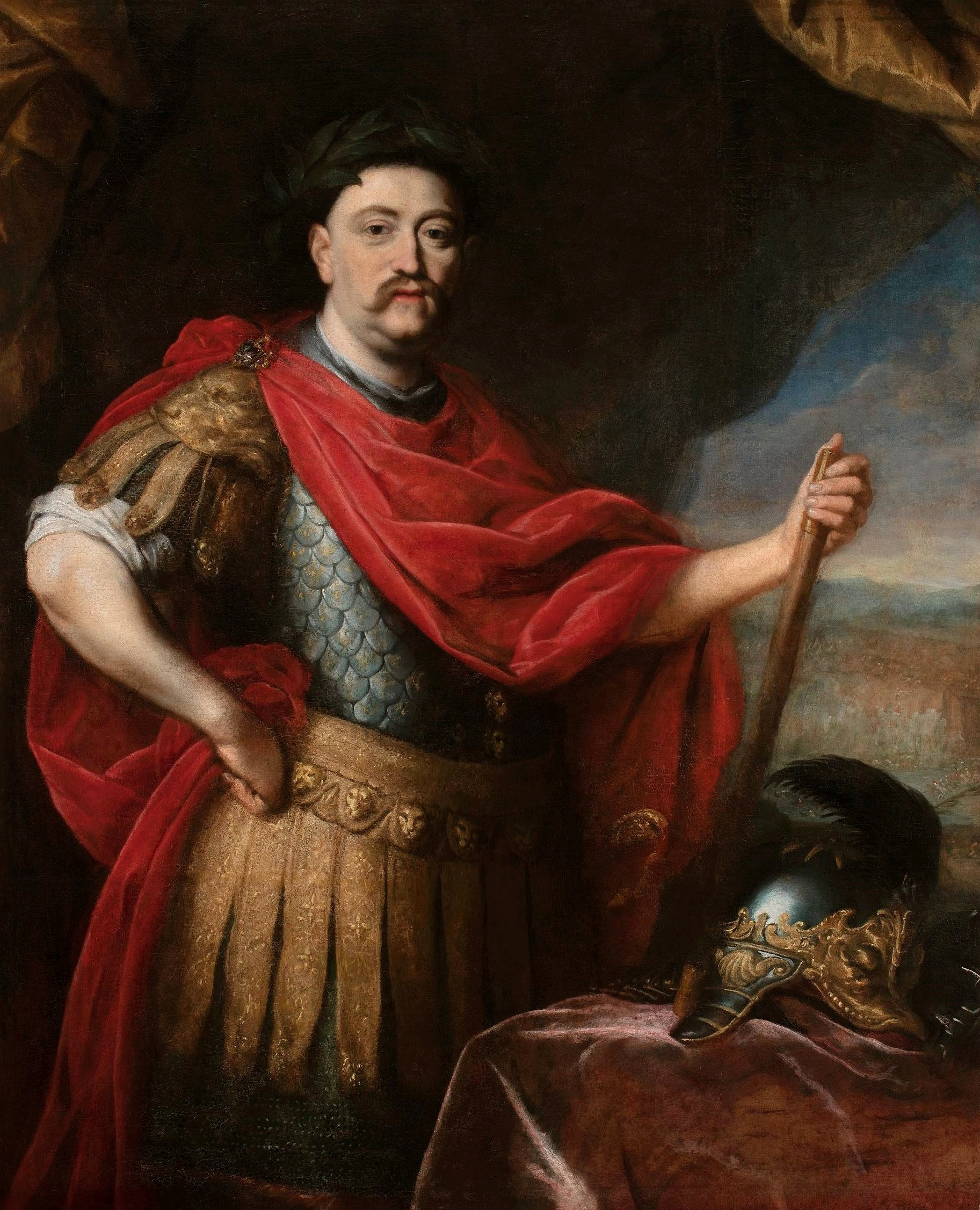
John III Sobieski died 17 June

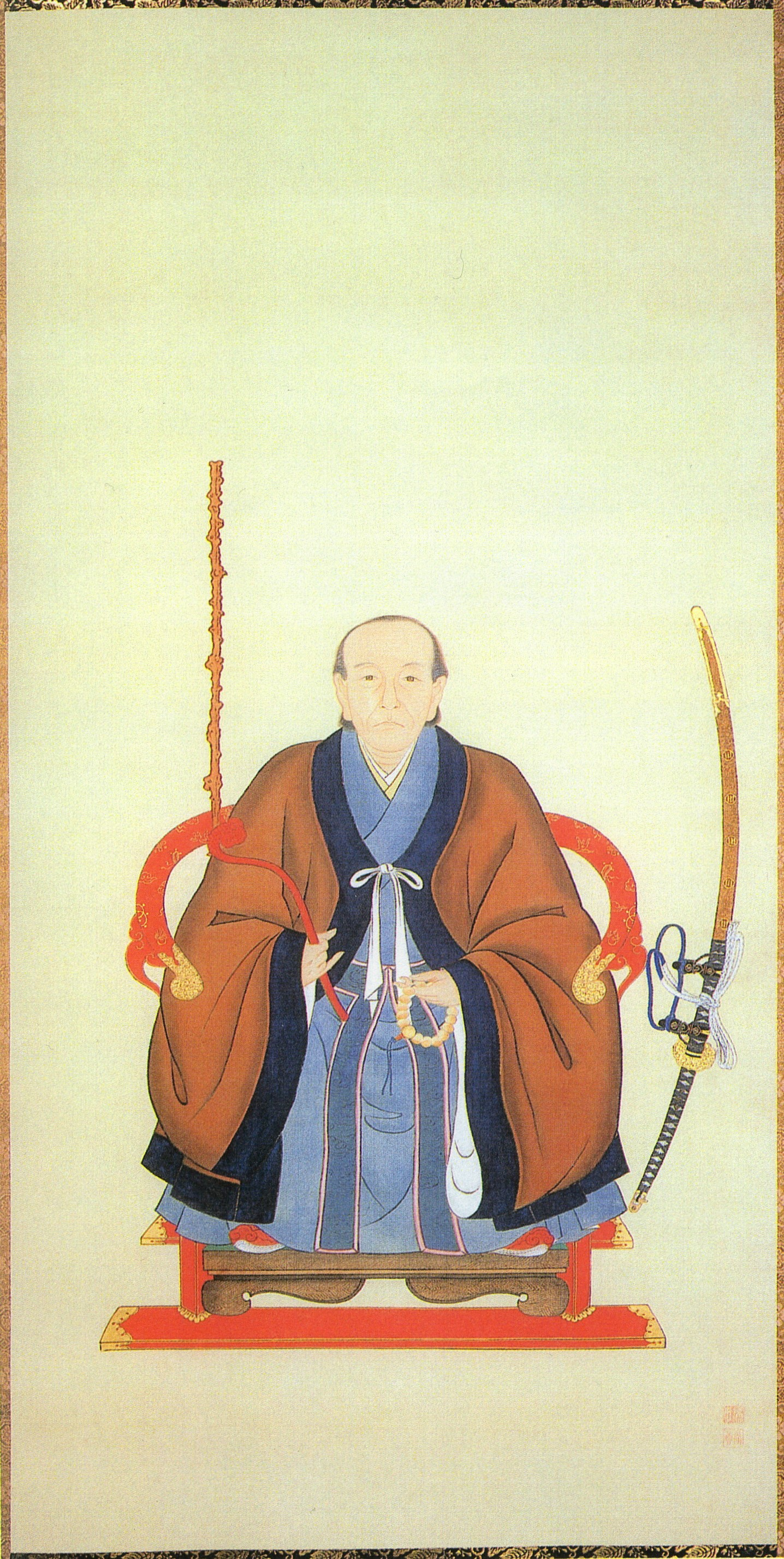
Inaba Masanori died 4 July

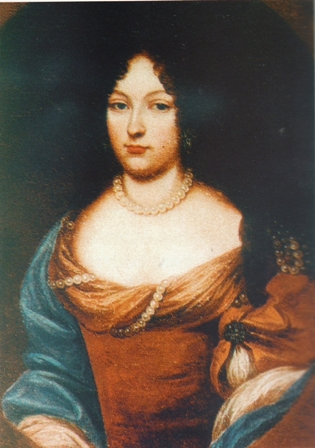
Raugravine Caroline Elisabeth died 7 July

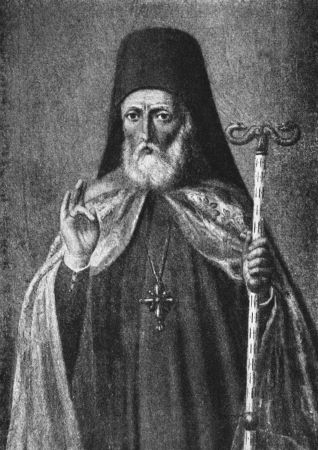
Dionysius III of Constantinople died 14 October

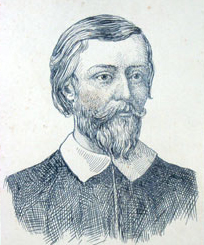
Gregório de Matos died 26 November

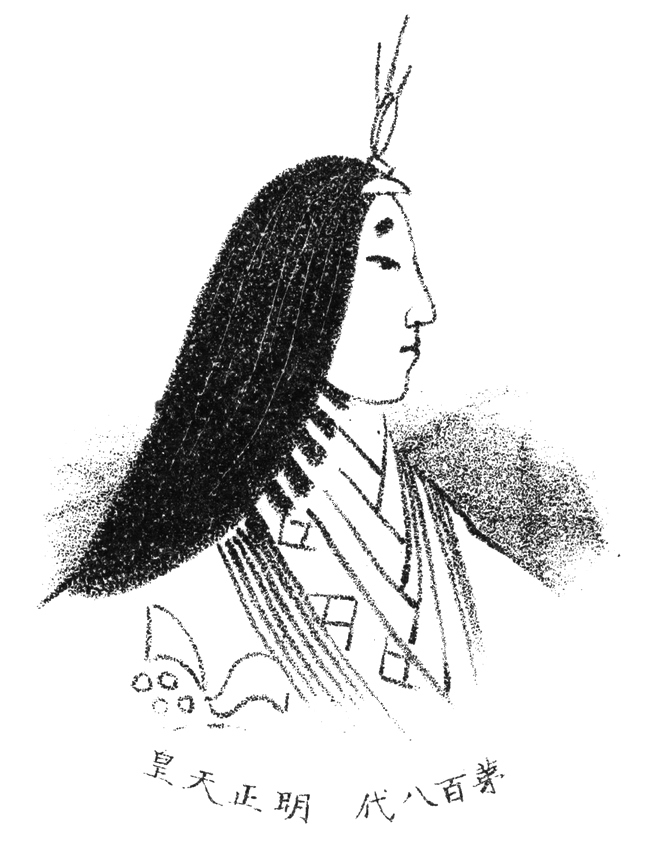
Empress Meishō died 4 December

=== January–March ===
- January 11 – Charles Albanel, French missionary explorer in Canada (b. 1616)
- January 13 – Giovanni Cosimo Bonomo, Italian physician (b. 1666)
- January 15 – Bartholomäus Kilian, German engraver (b. 1630)
- January 21 – Inés de Benigánim, Spanish religious (b. 1625)
- February – Ahom King Supaatphaa or Gadadhar Singha
- February 1 – Molly Verney, British artist (b. 1675)
- February 4 – Philip Wharton, 4th Baron Wharton, English soldier (b. 1613)
- February 8 – Tsar Ivan V of Russia, Tsar of Russia from 1682 to 1696 (b. 1666)
- February 12 – George Bradbury, English judge (b. 1643)
- February 19 – Giovanni Pietro Bellori, Italian painter and biographer (b. 1613)
- March 6 – Mary Knatchbull, Knatchbull, Mary, abbess of the Convent of the Immaculate Conception, Ghent (b. 1610)
- March 8 – Thomas Street, English judge and politician (b. 1625)
- March 9 – Jean de la Vallée, Swedish architect (b. 1620)
- March 14 – Jean Domat, French jurist (b. 1625)
- March 16 – Louis Laneau, French bishop active in the kingdom of Siam (b. 1637)
- March 17 – Élisabeth Marguerite d'Orléans, French noble (b. 1646)
- March 18 – Bonaventure Baron, Irish Friar Minor and scholar (b. 1610)
- March 24
  - Jacqueline Bouette de Blémur, French Benedictine nun and writer (b. 1618)
  - Marie de Miramion, French woman known for her piety (b. 1629)
- March 25 – Henry Casimir II, Prince of Nassau-Dietz, Stadholder of Friesland and Groningen (b. 1657)

=== April–June ===
- April 10 – Springett Penn, Member of the Penn family (b. 1674)
- April 12 – George Corwin, High Sheriff during Salem Witch trials (b. 1666)
- April 14 – Isaac de l'Ostal de Saint-Martin, French botanist (b. 1629)
- April 17 – Marie de Rabutin-Chantal, marquise de Sévigné, French writer (b. 1626)
- April 27 – Simon Foucher, French philosopher (b. 1644)
- April 30 – Robert Plot, British naturalist (b. 1640)
- May 11 – Jean de La Bruyère, French writer and philosopher (b. 1645)
- May 15 – Samuel Appleton, military leader (b. 1625)
- May 16 – Mariana of Austria, Queen consort of Spain (b. 1634)
- May 17 – Antoine d'Aquin, physician (b. 1629)
- May 26 – Countess Albertine Agnes of Nassau, Regent of Friesland, Groningen and Drenthe (1664–1679) (b. 1634)
- May 28 – William Gregory, British judge and politician (b. 1625)
- May 30 – Henry Capell, 1st Baron Capell, First Lord of the British Admiralty (b. 1638)
- May 31 – Heinrich Schwemmer, German music teacher and composer (b. 1621)
- June – Greta Duréel, Swedish noblewoman and bank fraud
- June 2 – William Herbert, 1st Marquess of Powis, English marquess (b. 1626)
- June 9 – Antoine Varillas, French historian (b. 1624)
- June 10 – Charles de Courbon de Blénac, French colonial administrator (b. 1622)
- June 12 – Queen Anu, Mongolian noble (b. 1653)
- June 17
  - Jørgen Bjelke, Officer, nobleman (b. 1621)
  - John III Sobieski, King of Poland and Grand Duke of Lithuania (b. 1629)
  - Emilio Taruffi, Italian painter (b. 1633)
- June 22 – Jacobus Tollius, Dutch classicist (b. 1633)
- June 24 – Philip Henry, English Nonconformist clergyman and diarist (b. 1631)
- June 26 – Alonso Xuárez, Spanish Baroque composer (b. 1640)
- June 28 – Eiler Holck, Danish military officer (b. 1627)
- June 29 – Michel Lambert, French singing master, theorbist and composer (b. 1610)

=== July–September ===
- July 4 – Inaba Masanori, daimyo (b. 1623)
- July 6 – Hector d'Andigné de Grandfontaine, Governor of Acadia from 1670 to 1673 (b. 1627)
- July 7 – Raugravine Caroline Elisabeth (b. 1659)
- July 11 – William Godolphin, English diplomat for Charles II and Member of Parliament (b. 1635)
- July 22 – Hendrik van Minderhout, Flemish painter (b. 1632)
- July 25 – Clamor Heinrich Abel, German Baroque composer, violinist and organist (b. 1634)
- July 28
  - Charles Colbert, marquis de Croissy, French politician and diplomat (b. 1629)
  - Sir Bourchier Wrey, 4th Baronet, English politician (b. 1653)
- August 2 – Robert Campbell of Glenlyon, Scottish military commander at the Massacre of Glencoe (b. 1630)
- August 9 – Wacław Potocki, Polish noble (b. 1621)
- August 14 – Sir John Barker, 4th Baronet, English politician, born 1655 (b. 1655)
- August 22 – Robert Austen, politician (b. 1642)
- August 28 – Hans Adam von Schöning, German general (b. 1641)
- September 1 – Donat John, Count Heissler of Heitersheim, Austrian general (b. 1648)
- September 4 – Celestino Sfondrati, Italian Catholic cardinal (b. 1644)
- September 5 – Henry Albin, English minister (b. 1624)
- September 7 – John Powell, Welsh judge; (b. 1633)
- September 9 – Princess Eleonore Erdmuthe of Saxe-Eisenach, Margravine of Brandenburg-Ansbach and Electress of Saxony (b. 1662)
- September 13 – Caleb Banks, English politician (b. 1659)
- September 17 – Daniel Danielis, Belgian composer (b. 1635)
- September 21 – Charles de Montsaulnin, Comte de Montal, 17th century French military officer and noble (b. 1619)
- September 23 – Dionysius IV of Constantinople, Ecumenical Patriarch (b. 1620)
- September 24 – Sir Ralph Verney, 1st Baronet, of Middle Claydon, English Baronet (b. 1613)
- September 28 – Archduchess Maria Theresa of Austria, Austrian archduchess, daughter of Leopold I (b. 1684)
- September 29 – Íñigo Melchor de Velasco, 7th Duke of Frías, Spanish governor of The Netherlands (b. 1629)

=== October–December ===
- October 3 – Prospero Intorcetta, Italian Jesuit missionary (b. 1625)
- October 9 – Charles La Tourasse, French colonial Governor (b. 1630)
- October 14 – Dionysius III of Constantinople, Ecumenical Patriarch of Constantinople (b. 1615)
- October 17
  - Giovanni Battista Boccabadati (b. 1635)
  - Geoffrey Shakerley, English politician (b. 1619)
- October 22 – James Ramsay, Minister of the Church of Scotland, Bishop of Dunblane, Bishop of Ross (b. 1624)
- October 30 – Andrea de Rossi, Roman Catholic archbishop (b. 1644)
- November 26
  - Sir Richard Atkins, 2nd Baronet, English politician (b. 1654)
  - Gregório de Matos, Brazilian poet and lawyer (b. 1636)
- December 4 – Empress Meishō, empress of Japan (b. 1624)
- December 8 – Charles Porter, Irish politician (b. 1631)
- December 12
  - Johan Caspar von Cicignon, Danish/Luxembourgian military officer (b. 1625)
  - John Hampden, English politician, died 1696 (b. 1653)
- December 13 – Georg Matthäus Vischer, Austrian cartographer (b. 1628)
- December 15 – Sir John Knatchbull, 2nd Baronet, English politician (b. 1634)
- December 21 – Louise Moillon, French painter (b. 1610)
- December 23 – Sir William Williams, 6th Baronet, Welsh politician and landowner (c. 1668–96) (b. 1660)
- December 28 – Miguel de Molinos, Spanish priest, apostle of Quietism (b. 1628)
- December 31 – Samuel Annesley, Puritan/nonconformist pastor (b. 1620)
- date unknown – Daibhidh Ó Duibhgheannáin (b. 1651)
