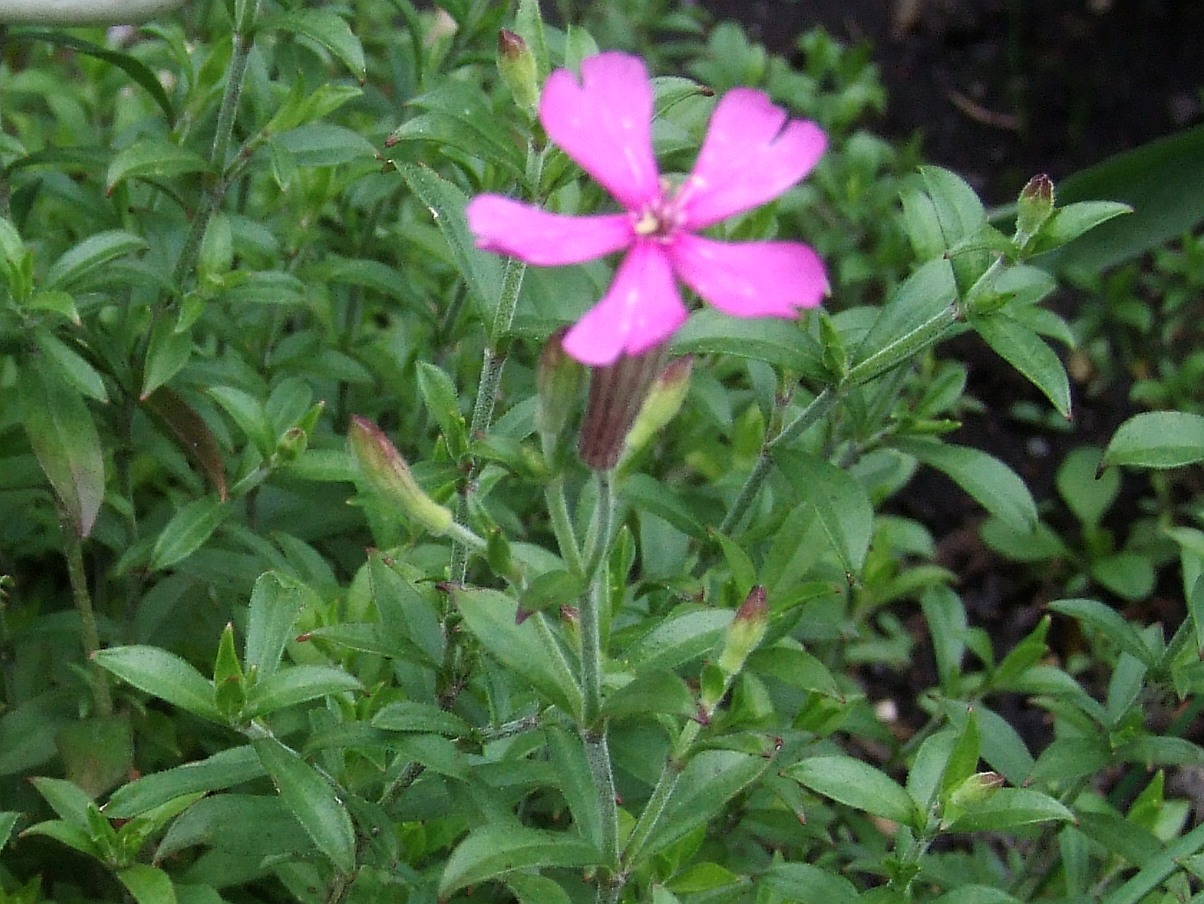

Scientific classification
- Kingdom: Plantae
- Clade: Tracheophytes
- Clade: Angiosperms
- Clade: Eudicots
- Order: Caryophyllales
- Family: Caryophyllaceae
- Genus: Silene
- Species: S. schafta

Binomial name
- Silene schafta Gmel. ex Hohen.

Synonyms
- Silene perfoliata Fenzl; Silene pernoctans Fenzl; Silene pichleri Stapf

= Silene schafta =

Species of flowering plant

Silene schafta, the Caucasian campion or autumn catchfly, is a species of flowering plant in the family Caryophyllaceae, native to western Asia. Growing to 25 cm (10 in) tall by 30 cm (12 in) wide, it is a mat-forming semi-evergreen perennial, with narrow leaves and clusters of bright pink, five-petalled flowers in late summer.

The specific epithet schafta derives from a local Caspian name for this plant.

Valued in the garden as easily grown groundcover for rock gardens, Silene schafta has gained the Royal Horticultural Society's Award of Garden Merit.

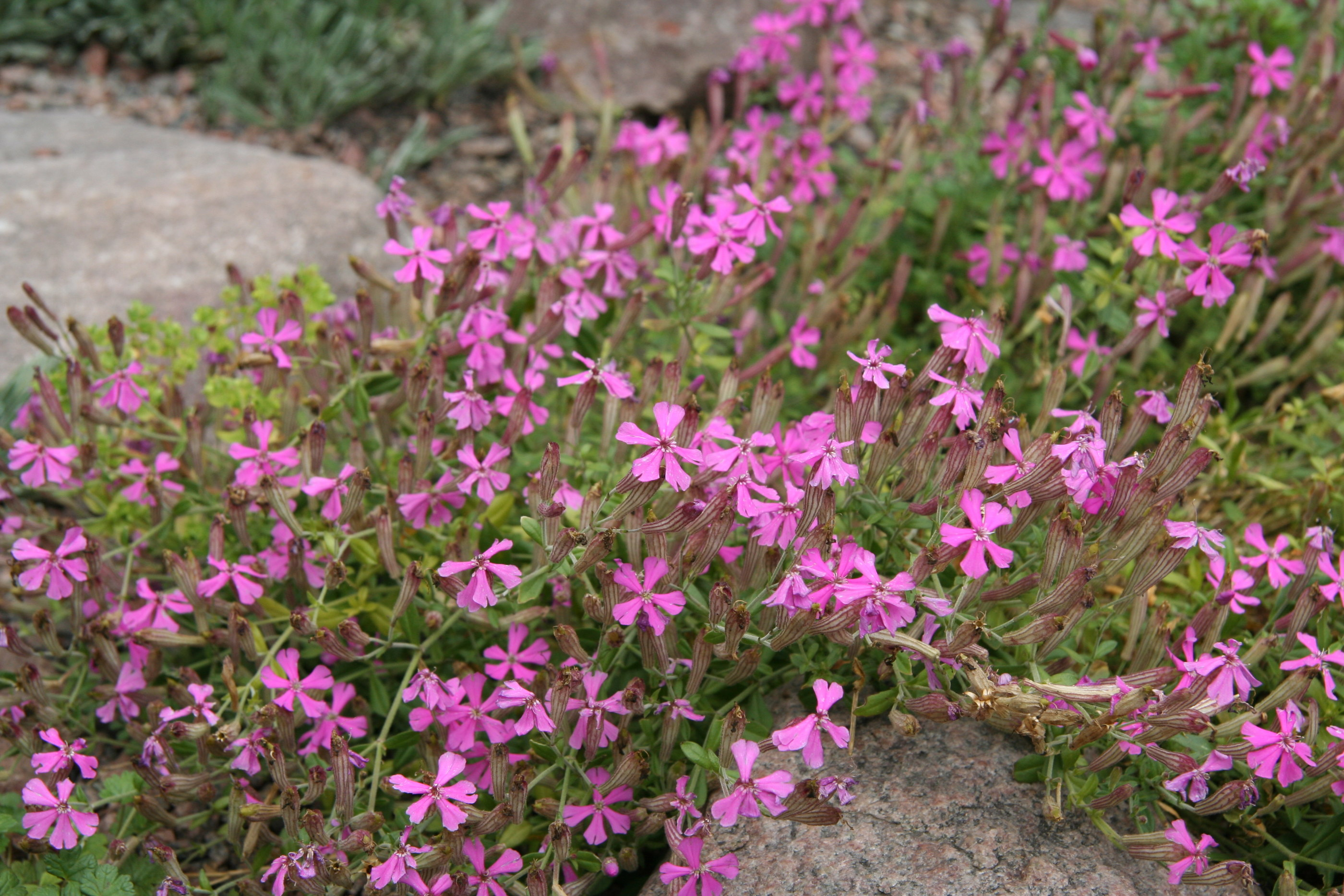

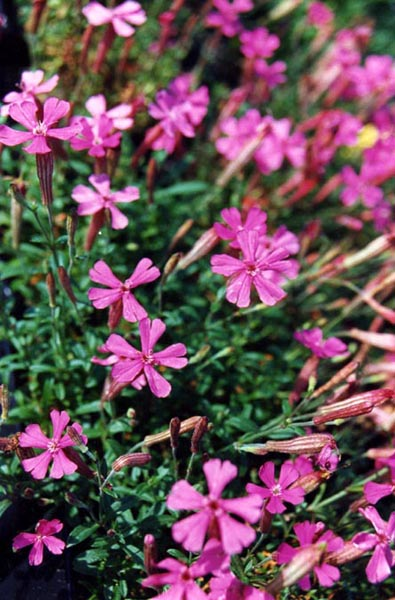

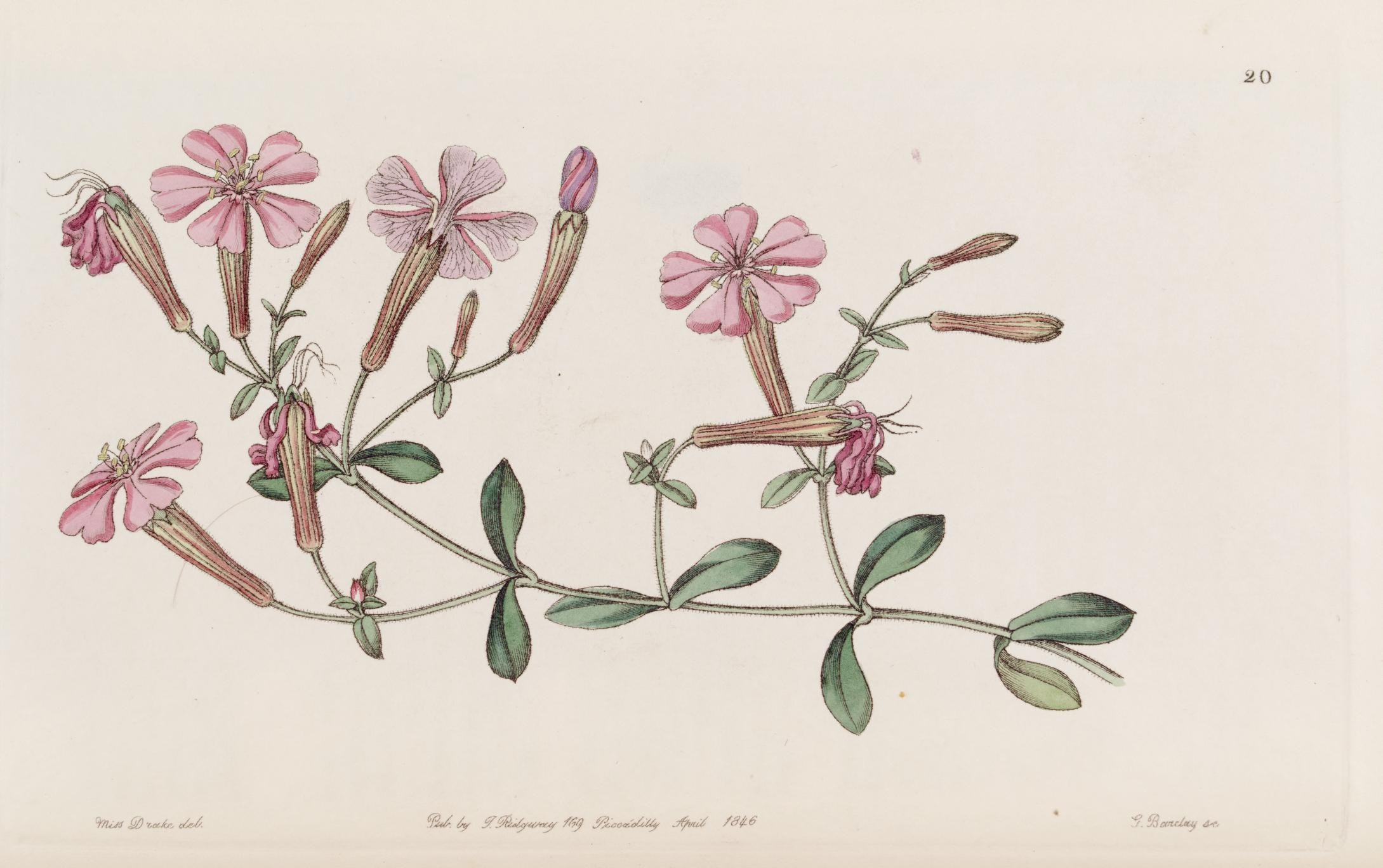
Illustration (1846)
