= Maria von Herbert =

Austrian aristocrat (1769–1803)

Baroness Maria Regina von Herbert (born 6 September 1769 in Klagenfurt; died 23 May 1803) was an Austrian aristocrat and letter writer. She was the sister of Franz Paul von Herbert, an Austrian patron and white-lead paint manufacturer. She is best known for her letters to Immanuel Kant.

== Life ==
Maria "Miza" (or "Mitza") von Herbert was a daughter of industrial pioneer Johann Michael Baron von Herbert and Maria Anna née Fux (1749–1779). She was raised in the Herbertstöckl, the mansion house of the Herberts at St. Veiter Ring in Klagenfurt, and bought the Stückler Stöckl in Klagenfurt St. Martin in March 1802, a little more than a year before her disappearance. She was a member of a circle of people from Klagenfurt and vicinity around her brother Franz Paul von Herbert who shared anti-monarchist views, a background of Freemasonry, and an interest in Kantian philosophy. Her brother was acquainted with major protagonists of the intellectual life of the German-speaking world. Maria von Herbert probably had a liaison with Ignaz von Dreer zu Thurnhub (1762–1842), another member of the Herbert circle. This "friend", as she calls him in her letters, turned away from her after she told him about an earlier relationship to another man. After that, she was unable to give her life a new purpose, or meaning, which led her to write her first letter to Kant in 1791. There we find: "[I]f I hadn't read so much of your work I would certainly have taken my own life by now." She asks Kant "for help, for solace, or counsel to prepare [her] for death". Kant replies in a lengthy letter whose draft survived. Two more letters by Maria von Herbert followed, written at the beginning of 1793 and 1794 respectively. Although Kant announced another letter to her in his correspondence with Karl Leonhard Reinhold in May 1793, Maria von Herbert received no other letter by him. On 23 May 1803, the day of her disappearance, she gave a déjeuner at the Stückler Stöckl. She left her guests under some pretence and, probably on the same day, took her own life, as announced in letters she left to her intimates. Her body was never found. As became publicly known only in 2016 through an exhibition at the University of Klagenfurt, she left behind an illegitimate son.

== Correspondence ==
To date, only four letters are known by Maria von Herbert, which, although orthographically weak – as most women's writing at that time – are marked by philosophical stringency and eloquence. Her three letters to Kant raise several philosophical issues concerning friendship, objectification, the Kantian distinction between lying (saying something that is not true) and reticence (saying not all that is true), and suicide. The fourth letter is from 1800 and addressed to Johann Benjamin Erhard, her brother's closest friend. She asks Erhard to visit her brother, who was then struck with apathy and suffering from ill health, or to get him to Berlin under some pretense. She feared that he will take his own life – which eventually he did in 1811, eight years after her own voluntary death.

== Bibliography ==
- Wilhelm Baum (1989). Weimar – Jena – Klagenfurt: Der Herbert-Kreis und das Geistesleben Kärntens im Zeitalter der Französischen Revolution. Klagenfurt: Kärntner Druck- und Verlagsgesellschaft.
- Heidemarie Bennent-Vahle (1996). "'O mein Herz springt in Tausend stük': Zum Briefwechsel zwischen Kant und Maria von Herbert." In Die Philosophin, Vol. 7, No. 14, pp. 9–31.
- Wilhelm Berger, Thomas H. Macho (eds.) (1989). Kant als Liebesratgeber: Eine Klagenfurter Episode. Vienna: Verlag des Verbandes der wissenschaftlichen Gesellschaften Österreichs.
- Immanuel Kant (1968). Gesammelte Schriften, Vol. XI: Briefe 1789–1794. Deutsche Akademie der Wissenschaften zu Berlin. Berlin: De Gruyter.
- Rae Langton (1992). "Duty and Desolation." In Philosophy, Vol. 81, pp. 481–505.
- Rae Langton (2007). "Objective and Unconditioned Value." In The Philosophical Review, Vol. 116, No. 2, 2007, pp. 157–185.
- Rae Langton (2009). Sexual Solipsism: Philosophical Essays on Pornography and Objectification. Oxford, New York: Oxford University Press.
- James E. Mahon (2006). "Kant and Maria von Herbert: Reticence vs. Deception." In Philosophy, Vol. 81, pp. 417–444.
- Guido Naschert (2015). "Reinhold und die Kant-Rezeption im Klagenfurter Herbert-Kreis." In Violetta L. Waibel (ed.). Umwege. Annäherungen an Immanuel Kant in Wien, in Österreich und in Osteuropa. Göttingen: V&R unipress, pp. 161–168, pp. 575–577.
- Max Ortner (1924). "Kant in Kärnten." In Carinthia I, Vol. 114, pp. 65–86.
- Bernhard Ritter (2017). "Immanuel Kant, Maria von Herbert und der Klagenfurter Herbert-Kreis / Immanuel Kant, Maria von Herbert and the Klagenfurt Herbert Circle." In Christa Herzog and Barbara Maier (eds.). Kostbarkeiten aus der Bibliothek: Ausstellungen 1 bis 10 der Reihe 'Kostbarkeiten aus der Bibliothek' 2014 – 2017 / Treasures of the Library: Exhibitions 1 to 10 of the Series 'Treasures of the Library' 2014–2017. Klagenfurt: University of Klagenfurt, pp. 104–107.
- Werner Sauer (1982). Österreichische Philosophie zwischen Aufklärung und Restauration: Beiträge zur Geschichte des Frühkantianismus in der Donaumonarchie. Königshausen & Neumann, Würzburg, Amsterdam: Rodopi.
- Franz Sintenis (1879). "Maria von Herbert und Kant." In Altpreussische Monatsschrift, Vol. 16, pp. 270–285.
- Karl August Varnhagen von Ense (1830). Denkwürdigkeiten aus dem Leben des Philosophen und Arztes Johann Benjamin Erhard. Stuttgart, Tübingen: Gotha'sche Buchhandlung.
- Arnulf Zweig (1999). "Introduction." In Immanuel Kant: Correspondence: The Cambridge Edition of the Works of Immanuel Kant. Cambridge: Cambridge University Press, pp. 1–44.
