= Boccabadati =

Boccabadati is an Italian surname. Notable people with the surname include:

- Giovanni Battista Boccabadati (1635–1696), Italian lawyer, mathematician, engineer, and writer, especially of plays
- Luigia Boccabadati (1800–1850), Italian operatic soprano
