= Aix-en-Issart =

- Commune
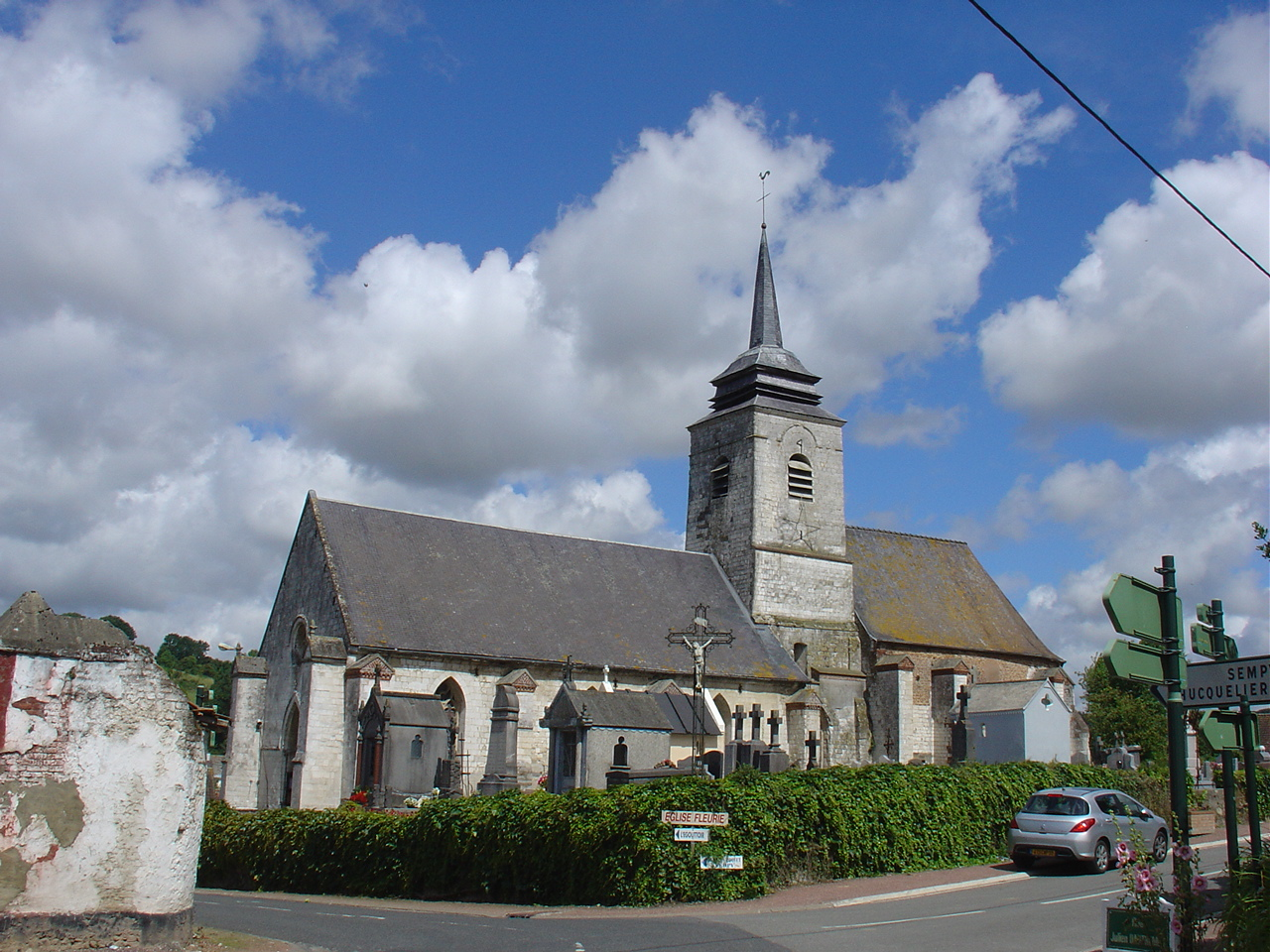
- The church of Aix-en-Issart

- Coat of arms
- Location of Aix-en-Issart
- Location within France Location within Hauts-de-France
- Coordinates: 50°28′39″N 1°51′34″E
- Country: France
- Region: Hauts-de-France
- Department: Pas-de-Calais
- Arrondissement: Montreuil
- Canton: Auxi-le-Château
- Intercommunality: CC des 7 Vallées

Government
  - Mayor (2020–2026): Pierre Lafonte
- Area^{1}: 10.1 km^{2} (3.9 sq mi)
- Elevation: 22 m (72 ft)
- Highest elevation: 125 m (410 ft)
- Lowest elevation: 15 m (49 ft)
- Population (2023): 264
  - Density: 26.1/km^{2} (67.7/sq mi)
- Time zone: UTC+01:00 (CET)
  - Summer (DST): UTC+02:00 (CEST)
- INSEE/Postal code: 62018 /62170
- ^{1} French Land Register data, which excludes lakes, ponds, glaciers > 1 km^{2} (0.386 sq mi or 247 acres) and river estuaries.

Aix-en-Issart (French pronunciation: [ɛks ɑ̃n‿isaʁ]) is a commune in the Pas-de-Calais department in northern France. A place named in Ascio is mentioned as early as 800 AD while during the Middle Ages the place used to be called Rodenaken by Flemish speaking people.

== Geography ==
A small village situated some 7 kilometres [5 miles] east of Montreuil-sur-Mer, at the D149 and D129 crossroads, by the banks of the small river Bras de Bronne, a tributary of the Canche.

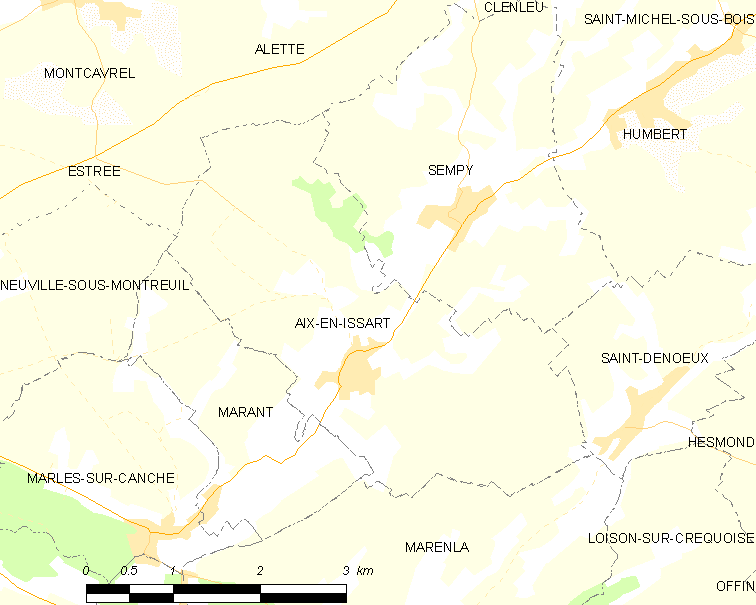
Map of the commune and adjacent places

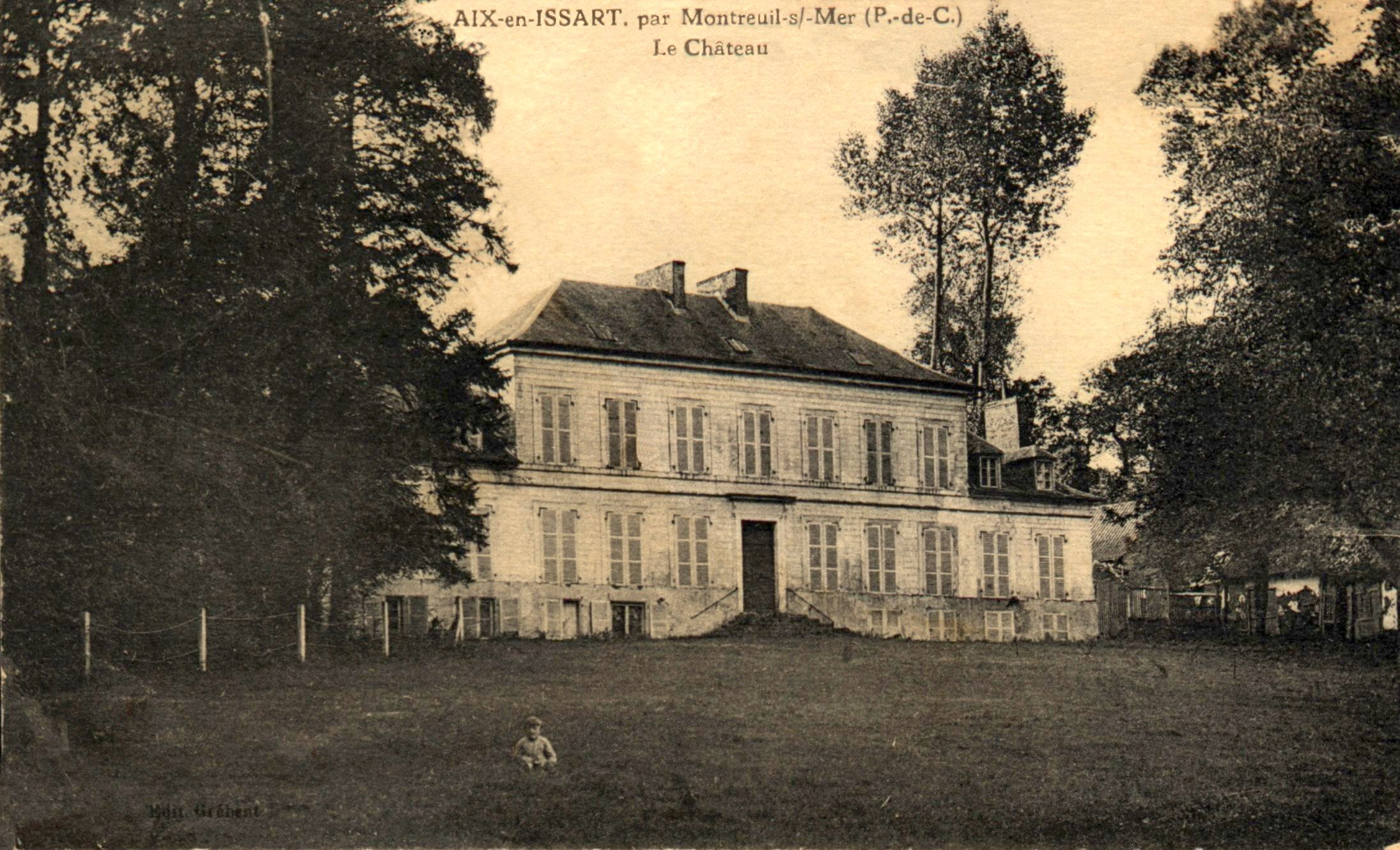
Chateau

== Population ==
Historical population
Year	Pop.	±% p.a.
1968	283	—
1975	264	−0.99%
1982	239	−1.41%
1990	247	+0.41%
1999	210	−1.79%
2007	266	+3.00%
2012	260	−0.46%
2017	263	+0.23%
2023	264	+0.06%
Source: INSEE

== Notable person ==
Jean de Beaurain (1696–1771), geographer, was born in Aix-en-Issart.

== See also ==
- Communes of the Pas-de-Calais department
