= Ellen Weeton =

English school mistress, governess, and writer (25 December 1776–1850)

Ellen Weeton (1776–1850), also known as Nelly or Nellie Weeton, and by the married name Mrs Stock, was a Lancashire school mistress, woman letter writer and governess who was the author of Journal of a Governess, two volumes describing her life as a governess in the years 1807–1825.

== Life ==
Weeton was born in Up Holland in Lancashire on Christmas Day 1776 (or around 1777 according to some sources). She was baptised "Nelly" at St John the Evangelist's Church, Lancaster. She was named after her father's ship at his request. Her father was away when she was baptised. (Some sources call her "Ellen".) Her father transported slaves and worked for privateers.

She was very well educated for a woman of the time, and was employed throughout her life as a school mistress and governess, one of the few respectable occupations available to a woman during this period.

She is known for writing letters to her brother whom she held in very high regard when she started to copy the letters into a journal.

Weeton was well travelled, visiting Yorkshire, the Lake District, North Wales, the Isle of Man, and London. She was also a keen walker, and her exploits included an ascent of Snowdon, which she climbed alone in June 1825, aged 48. On the Isle of Man, she records walking 35 miles in a day, and ascending Greeba.

== Marriage ==
She married Aaron Stock at Holy Trinity Parish Church in Liverpool in 1814. A daughter, Mary, was born the following year. She had married him at the suggestion of her brother and it worked out poorly. Her new husband abused her and in time he demanded a separation threatening that he would have her confined to an asylum if she disagreed.

In 1821, Stock appeared in court for an assault on Weeton; she and her husband formally separated. Due to this, Weeton surrendered custody of her daughter, whom she would not see again until 1828.

== Published work ==
Weeton published nothing in her lifetime. Four volumes of her correspondence and some journals were gathered in 1936 and 1939 by Edward Hall, and were subsequently edited by JJ Bagley in 1969 as Miss Weeton's Journal of a Governess in two volumes.

== Death and legacy ==
Weeton died in 1849 and left her journals to her church minister. They reappeared in a book shop in Wigan in 1925 where they were found by Edward Hall. He edited them and they were published two volumes as Miss Weeton: a Journal of a Governess in 1936.
