= Jacqueline Bouette de Blémur =

17th-century French Benedictine nun and writer

Jacqueline Bouette de Blémur or Marie-Jacqueline Bouette de Blémur, (8 January 1618 – 24 March 1696 in Chatillon (fr)) known under the name Mère Saint-Benoît, was a 17th-century French Benedictine nun and mystical writer.

As an historian, she wrote several works:

- L'année bénédictine,
- Éloges de plusieurs personnes illustres en piété de l'ordre de Saint-Benoît,
- Vies des saints,
- Abrégé de la vie de la vénérable mère Charlotte Le Sergent, religieuse de Montmartre, etc.
