= Jean-Philippe-René de La Bléterie =

French historian and translator

- Born: 25 February 1696
- Died: 1 June 1772
- Occupation: Professor
- Scientific career
- Workplaces: Collège de France (1746–1768)

Jean-Philippe-René de La Bléterie (25 February 1696, Rennes – 1 June 1772, Paris) was a French historian and orator.

In 1712 he became a member of Paris oratory. He taught rhetorics and church history in Saint-Magloire Seminary in 1726-1730. Moreover, he was a professor in Royal college. La Bléterie was elected a member of Académie des Inscriptions et Belles-Lettres in 1742.

His main historical work, "The life of the Emperor Julian" (French: Vie de l’empereur Julien) about Roman emperor Julian the Apostate, was written in 1735. It became popular in France and was translated into English (1746) and German (1752), but it also was fiercely criticized by Voltaire. Edward Gibbon used this work when writing "The History of the Decline and Fall of the Roman Empire" and cited it in the chapter on Julian.

In 1748, another work by La Bléterie, "History of Jovian" (French: Histoire de Jovien), telling the story of other Roman emperor Jovian, was published. La Bléterie was also an author of a tragedy named "Themistocles".

== Literature ==
- Joseph-François Michaud, Louis Gabriel Michaud, Biographie universelle, Paris, C. Desplaces, t. 4, 1854, p. 438.
- Moatti, Claude (1995). "L'abbé de La Blèterie (1697-1772) : de l'érudition à la politique". Mélanges de l'École française de Rome: Italie et Méditerranée (in French). 1 (107): 121–143. doi:10.3406/mefr.1995.4364.
