= Philipp Friedrich Gmelin =

German professor of botany and chemistry (1721–1768)

Philipp F. Gmelin
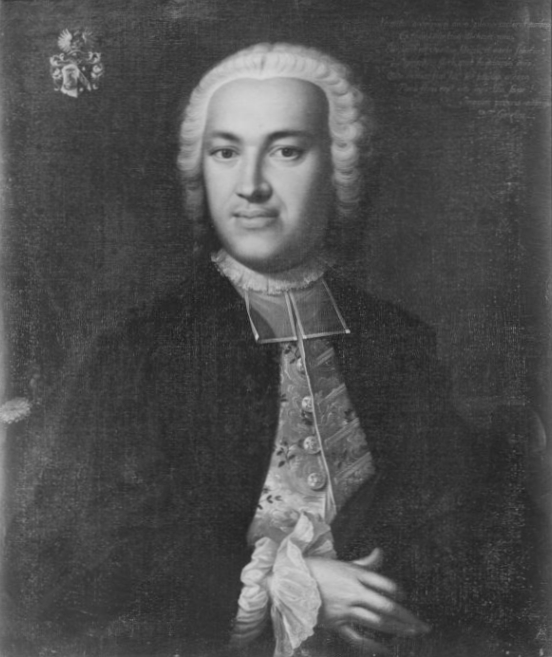
- Philipp Friedrich Gmelin (1721-1768)
- Born: 19 August 1721; Tübingen
- Died: 9 May 1768 (aged 46); Tübingen
- Education: University of Tübingen
- Known for: Pancreatic ducts Chemistry of antimony
- Scientific career
- Fields: Botanist and chemist
- Workplaces: University of Tübingen
- Doctoral advisor: Burchard Mauchart
- Doctoral students: Johann Friedrich Gmelin

Notes
- Johann Friedrich Gmelin is also his eldest son.

Philipp Friedrich Gmelin (19 August 1721 – 9 May 1768) was a professor of botany and chemistry. He studied the chemistry of antimony and wrote texts on the pancreatic ducts, mineral waters, and botany.

He was a brother of the famous traveler Johann Georg Gmelin. He obtained his Master's degree in 1742, at the University of Tübingen under Burchard Mauchart.

He was elected a Fellow of the Royal Society in 1758.

He was the father of the naturalist Johann Friedrich Gmelin.

== Works ==
- Otia botanica (in Latin). Tübingen: Christoph Heinrich Berger. 1760.
