= Burchard Mauchart =

Burchard David Mauchart
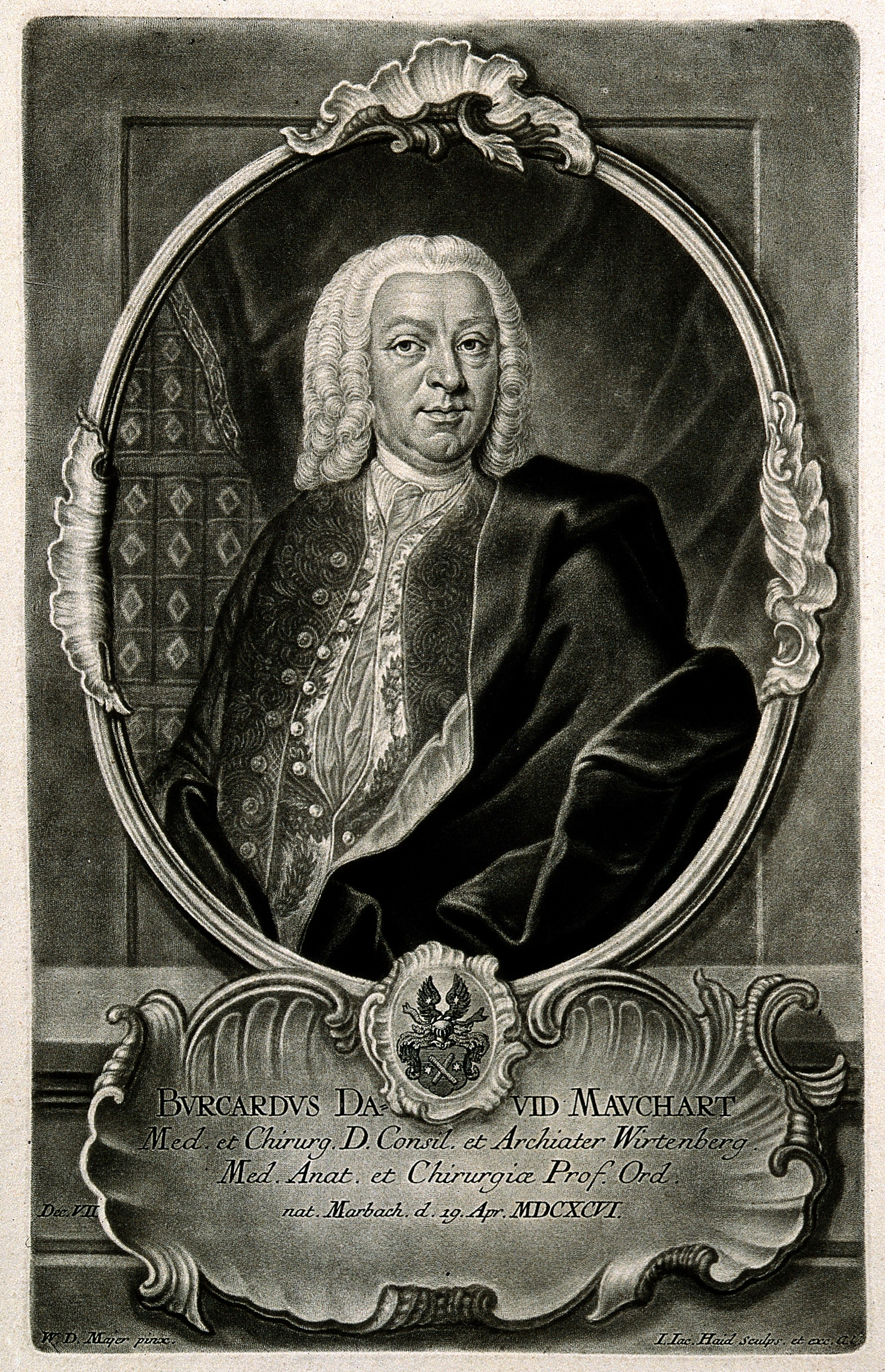
- Born: 19 April 1696; Marbach am Neckar, Holy Roman Empire
- Died: 11 April 1751 (aged 54); Tübingen, Holy Roman Empire
- Education: University of Tübingen
- Known for: Ophthalmology
- Scientific career
- Fields: Anatomist and surgeon
- Workplaces: University of Tübingen
- Doctoral advisor: Elias Rudolph Camerarius Jr.
- Doctoral students: Philipp Friedrich Gmelin

Burchard David Mauchart (19 April 1696 – 11 April 1751) was professor of anatomy and surgery at the University of Tübingen, Duchy of Württemberg, Holy Roman Empire, and a pioneer in the field of ophthalmology. In 1748 he became one of the first to document the eye disorder now known as keratoconus. His surviving works are now to be found in the form of theses by his students.

He obtained his Lic. Med. degree in 1722 at the University of Tübingen. Mauchart also studied for two years in Paris from 1718-1720 under the oculist Woolhouse.
