= Anne-Madeleine Remuzat =

French Roman Catholic nun

Venerable Anne-Madeleine Remuzat
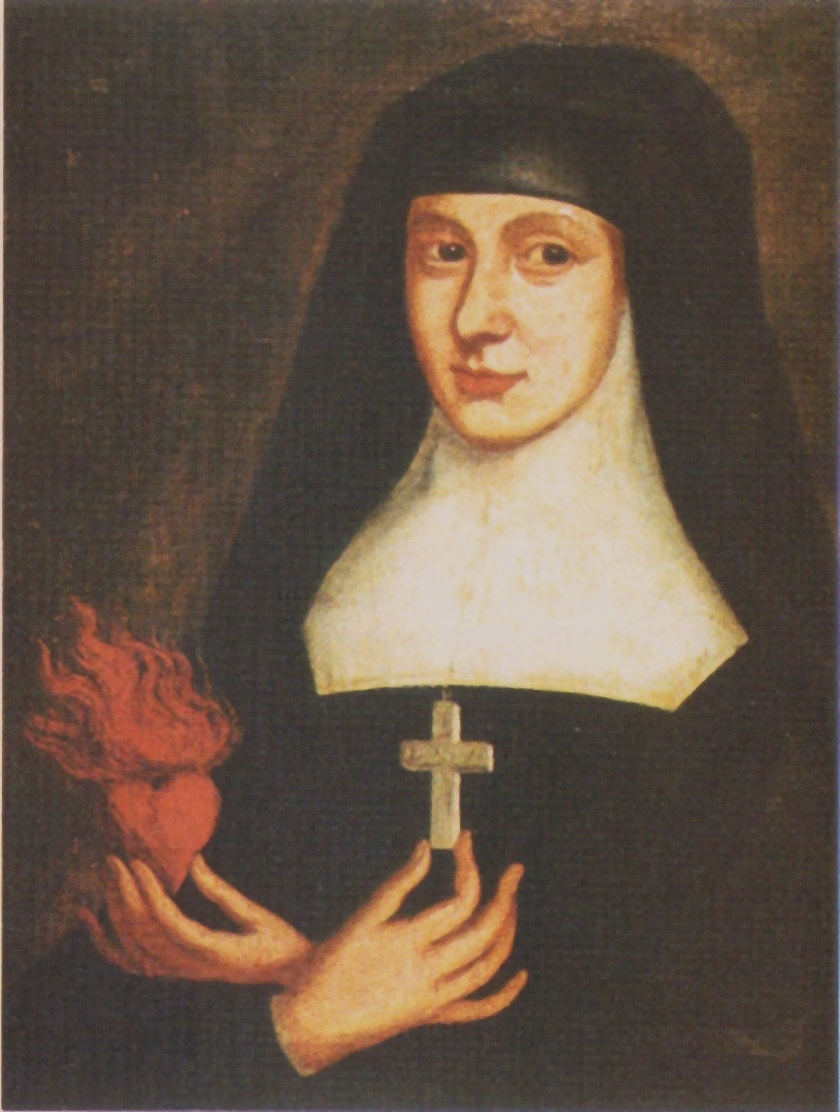
- Anne-Madeleine Remuzat

Religious
- Born: 29 November 1696; Marseille, Bouches-du-Rhône
- Died: 15 February 1730 (aged 33); Marseille
- Venerated in: Roman Catholic Church

Anne-Madeleine Remuzat (29 November 1696 – 15 February 1730) was a French Roman Catholic nun who was instrumental in spreading Catholic devotion to the Sacred Heart.

== Life ==
Anne Remuzat was born at Marseille, 29 November 1696, into a pious, wealthy family, and was baptized the same day in the Église Notre-Dame-des-Accoules. Her father was a merchant. At nine years of age, she asked to be allowed to enter the convent of the Visitation. After initially refusing, her parents finally allowed her to enter the second Monastery of the Visitation, where one of her relatives was a nun.

In 1709, Remuzat returned home and became active in various works of charity. Her vocation grew stronger in contact with the sick and the poor. In 1711, she entered as a postulant the First Monastery of the Visitation (the 'Grandes-Maries'), where there was a chapel dedicated to the Sacred Heart. On 14 January 1712 she became a novice, receiving the veil from Henri François Xavier de Belsunce de Castelmoron, Bishop of Marseille, who gave her the name "Anne-Madeleine". Later that year, her sister joined the Monastery, receiving the name, "Anne-Victoire". On 23 January 1713, Anne-Madeleine made her profession.

She applied herself to prayer, and progressed in the contemplative life. On 17 October 1713, she reportedly experienced a "particular and extraordinary" revelation of Jesus "concerning the glory of his Sacred Heart". As the repute of her sanctity became known, many consulted Anne-Madeleine in the parlor of the monastery. She wrote the statutes for the Association of Perpetual Adoration of the Sacred Heart, which was established in Marseille by Mgr de Belsunce in April 1718. A number of Monasteries of the Visitation promoted the Association in their Churches.

In 1720, during the plague at Marseille, the Lord enjoined her to institute a feast in honour of the Sacred Heart, which Mgr de Belsunce established on 22 October 1720. On 1 November, he solemnly consecrated the city and the Diocese to the Sacred Heart of Jesus. In response to requests from French bishops, Pope Pius IX promulgated the feast of the Sacred Heart in 1856.

=== Death and veneration ===
Sr Anne-Madeleine fell gravely ill at the end of January and died on 15 February 1730. Her heart is preserved in a reliquary at Sacré-Cœur, Paris. Miracles were attributed to her intercession. She considered the successor of St. Margaret Mary Alacoque for her promotion of devotion to the Sacred Heart.

In 1888, her cause was submitted to the Sacred Congregation, and she was declared "Venerable" on 24 December 1891, by Pope Leo XIII. In April 2009, Msgr. Georges Pontier, archbishop of Marseille, re-opened her cause.
