= Women letter writers =

Women in early modern Europe

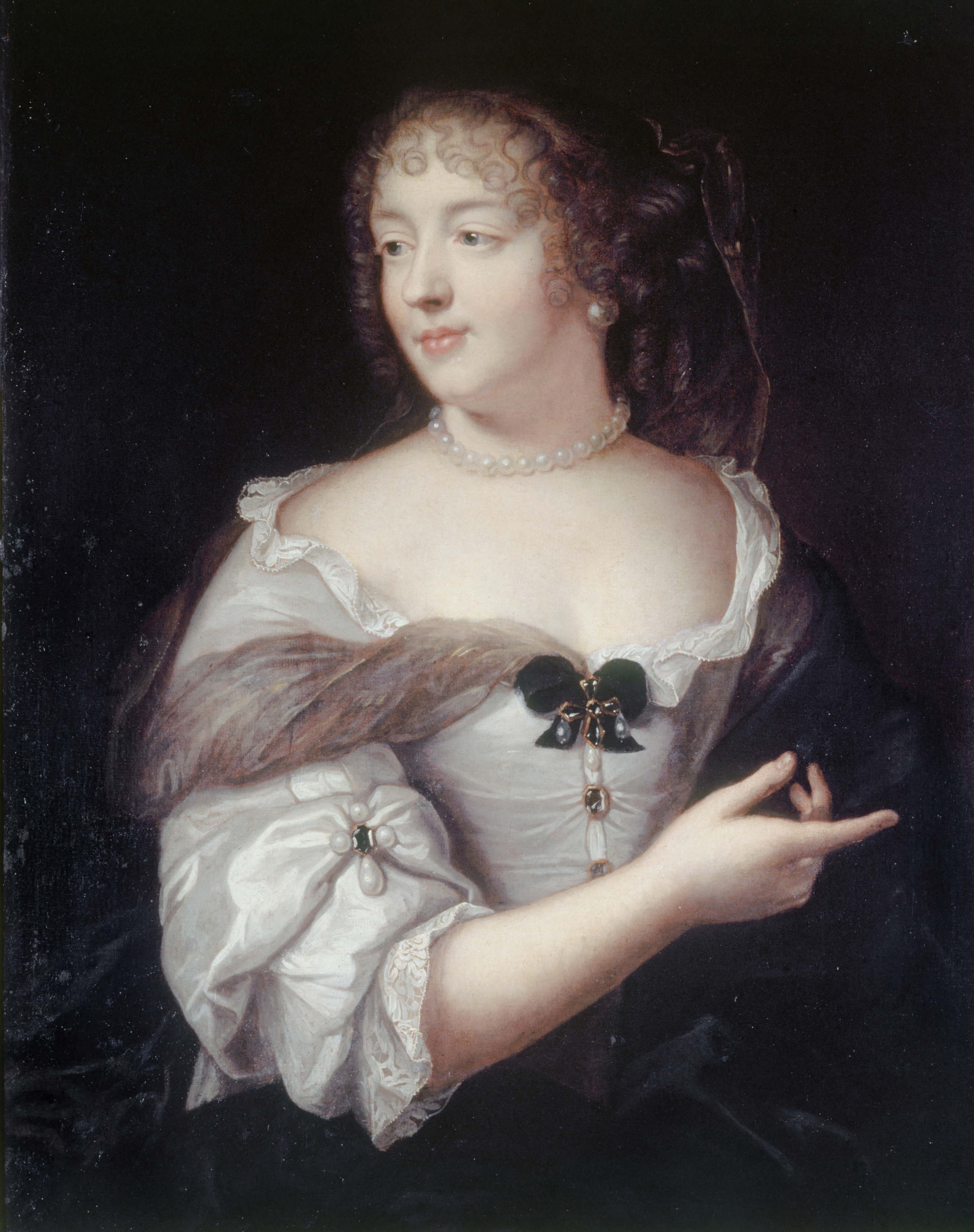
Marie de Sévigné, the Marquise de Sévigné, the archetypal female letter writer of Europe.

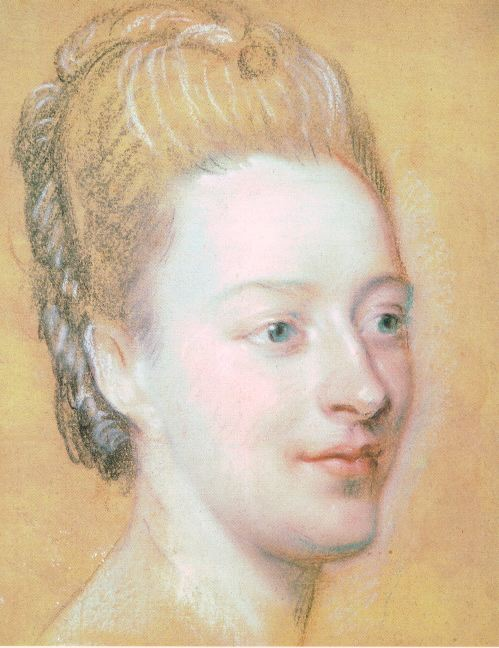
Letter writer Isabelle de Charrière.

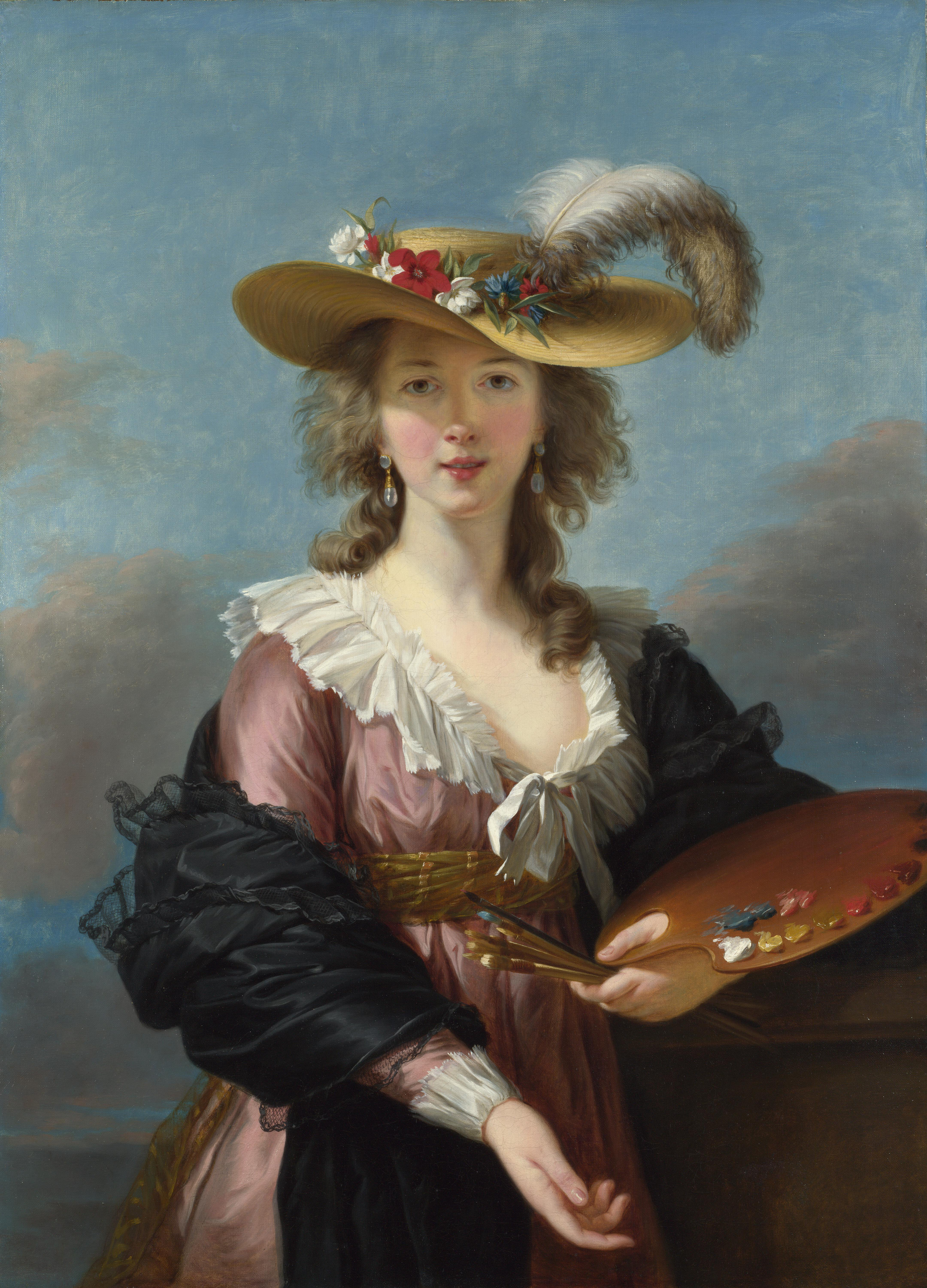
Self-Portrait in a Straw Hat, by letter writer Louise Élisabeth Vigée Le Brun.

Women letter writers in early modern Europe created lengthy correspondences, where they left a rich historical legacy. These were educated women who would describe their lives, the world around them, and historical events.

Over time, a large number of women's correspondences have been made the subject of publications. Some among them ignored the literary value of these missives that were sometimes circulated by their recipients. Some correspondences were, on the other hand, strictly private and their literary value—and historic value, as well—was not revealed until the rediscovery of these letters, perhaps long after the death of their authors, as in the case of Élisabeth Bégon, whose correspondence was not discovered until 1932 in the archives of the French Ministry of the Navy.

It is usually agreed that what makes these letters distinctive emanates from their spontaneity. Marie de Sévigné was the incarnation of this quality, to the point of becoming considered by many as the archetype of the woman letter writer, and an altogether literary author, even among her contemporaries, such as Suzanne Curchod:

It is this precious collection that seems to flow into the reputation of all women: because it is always repeated, ever since Madame de Sévigné, that women write better than men and that they feel things more delicately than them. Suzanne Curchod

In 1669, the famous Letters of a Portuguese Nun appeared, presented as a translation of five letters sent by a Portuguese nun to a French officer. For a long time, these letters were accepted as authentic letters written by Mariana Alcoforado, before being definitively shown by a modern critic to be a work of literary fiction, attributed to Gabriel de Guilleragues.

Some women who wrote letters did not lead remarkable lives. For instance Nellie Weeton was born in Lancashire and she was poorly treated by her brother and husband. She copied all the letters to her brother into journals and because some of these are extant they supply an insight into life in her time.

The frontier between reality and fiction becomes blurry between literature and correspondence, above all when novelists turned this writing technique into a literary device that would become the epistolary novel, a genre that reached its peak during the Enlightenment when writers tried to persuade readers that between their hands was a real correspondence, which is what Jean-Jacques Rousseau more or less achieved with Julie, or the New Heloise.

== Some famous women letter writers ==
- Heloise
- Juliette Adam
- Jeanne d'Albret
- Sophie Arnould
- Elizabeth Charlotte, Princess Palatine
- Louisa Dow Benton
- Louise Bénédicte de Bourbon
- Catherine de Bourbon
- Adélaïde de la Briche
- Cécile Bruyère
- Marie-Angélique de Coulanges
- Christine de Pisan
- Zulma Carraud
- Marquise de Caylus
- Isabelle de Charrière
- Anastasie de Circourt
- Mary Clarke
- Sophie Cottin
- Hélisenne de Crenne
- Suzanne Curchod
- Madeleine Des Roches
- Catherine Des Roches
- Marie Anne de Vichy-Chamrond, marquise du Deffand
- Louise d'Épinay
- Marie-Madeleine de La Fayette
- Marie-Thérèse Geoffrin
- Françoise de Graffigny
- Marie-Madeleine Hachard
- Anne-Catherine Helvétius
- Maria Theresa
- Sophie d'Houdetot
- Alix de Lamartine
- Ninon de Lenclos
- Amélie Lenormant
- Julie de Lespinasse
- Blandine Liszt
- Marie Anne de Mailly
- Françoise de Maintenon
- Sophie de Maraise
- Marguerite de Navarre
- Mary Montagu
- Matilda of Flanders
- Jeanne Marie Bouvier de La Mothe-Guyon
- Juliette Récamier
- Marie-Jeanne Riccoboni
- Manon Roland
- Gabrielle Roy
- Madeleine de Sablé
- Madame de Saint-Huberty
- Mariquita Sánchez
- George Sand
- Marie de Sévigné
- Marguerite de Launay, baronne de Staal
- Germaine de Staël
- Sophie Swetchine
- Claudine Guérin de Tencin
- Marie-Anne de La Trémoille
- Louise Élisabeth Vigée Le Brun
- Jane Vigor
- Sophie Volland
- Nellie Weeton (1776–1849)

== See also ==
- Women's writing
- Nu shu
- Écriture féminine
- Epistolary novel
- Women's history
