= Alonso Xuárez =

Alonso Xuárez de la Fuente Fuensalida (Toledo), 14 de abril de 1640 - Cuenca, 26 de junio de 1696, renowned musician of the Spanish Baroque, and a disciple of Tomás Miciezes el mayor in the Convent of Las Descalzas Reales of Madrid. He worked as chapel master in the cathedrals of Cuenca and Seville. The historiographical ambiguity about the nature of this prominent polychoralist persisted until 2011, when Professor of Music at the University of Castilla-La Mancha, José Luis de la Fuente Charfolé, managed to locate his birth certificate in the parish of San Juan Bautista in the town of Fuensalida (Toledo).

En la parroquial de Fuensalida en veintiocho de abril de mil y seisçientos y cuarenta años yo el licenciado Alonso del Caño y Robles, cura propio de la dicha villa bauticé a Alonso, hijo de Juan Bautista y de Ana de la Fuente, su mujer, el cual nació a catorce de abril de este año, fueron sus padrinos el licenciado Francisco Díaz Romo, y comadre mayor doña Maria Romo y Aguilar, su hija, y se les advirtió el parentesco espiritual que contraían con este bautizado y con sus padres, y lo firmé, Juan Ximenez.

His works are distributed among the cathedrals of Cuenca and Seville; individual pieces have also been located in the cathedrals of Astorga, Burgos, Cádiz, Las Palmas, Salamanca, Santiago de Compostela, Segovia, Valladolid; the Collegiate Churches of Santa María in Talavera de la Reina and Jerez, the Royal College of Corpus Christi in Valencia, the Bavarian State Library in Munich, and the National Center for Research, Documentation, and Musical Information in Mexico City

He had prestigious disciples, such as the brothers Diego and Sebastián Durón, who acceded to outstanding posts due to his recommendations: the first one chapel master in the Cathedral of Las Palmas and the second as organist in Seville Cathedral.

== History ==
- Chapel master in Cuenca Cathedral – First Stage (1664–1675)
- Chapel master in Seville Cathedral – (1675–1684)
- Chapel master in Cuenca Cathedral – Second Stage (1684–1696)
