= Élisabeth Bégon =

French writer (1696–1755)

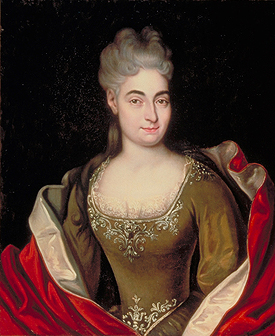

Élisabeth Bégon née Marie-Isabelle-Élisabeth Rocbert de la Morandière (born in Montréal in 1696, died in 1755), was a French-Canadian letter writer. She is known for the correspondence she wrote to her widowed son-in-law Honoré-Gabriel Michel de Villebois de La Rouvillière (1702-1752) between 1748 and 1753. The first of her extant letters describe the daily life of an elite colonial laywoman in New France between 1748 and 1749, when Bégon left Canada and settled in Rochefort. She continued to write to Michel from France, and her last known letters were written after their intended recipient's death in New Orleans as news was slow to reach her.

Bégon's oeuvre (a collection of written correspondence including letters, nine notebooks, and thirty-nine leaflets ) was published in 1935 under the title Lettres au cher fils. The correspondence was mainly addressed to her son-in-law (Michel de Villebois de la Rouvillière), named commissaire ordonnateur of Louisiana in 1747, a post he did not assume until 1749. Lettres au cher fils only include those letters penned by Élisabeth Bégon herself; no return letters have ever been found. Her correspondence is unique to the writings of New France as it is one of the only known works written by a French Canadian laywoman during this period of time.

The original letters can be found at the National Library and Archives of Quebec.

== See also ==
- Women letter writers
