= Jean de Beaurain =

French geographer

- Born: 7 January 1696; Aix-en-Issart, Artois, France
- Died: 12 February 1771 (aged 75); Paris
- Known for: Creation of maps
- Scientific career
- Fields: Geographer
- Institutions: Paris
- Patrons: Cardinal André-Hercule de Fleury, Bishop of Fréjus; King Louis XV

Jean de Beaurain (17 January 1696 – 12 February 1771) was a French geographer to Louis XV.

Jean de Beaurain was a French geographer — geographer of Louis XV — born on 7 January 1696 in Aix-en-Issart in Artois and died on 12 February 1771 in Paris.

== Biography ==
Beaurain was said to be a descendant of the former castellans of Beaurain. At the age of nineteen, he went to Paris, and studied geography under the direction of Pierre Moulart-Samson, geographer to the king, a title that Beaurain himself obtained at the age of twenty-five. An ecclesiastical and civil perpetual calendar that he published in 1724 made him known to Louis XV, for whom he made many maps and plans. The Cardinal André-Hercule de Fleury, Bishop of Fréjus, employed him several times for delicate negotiations. He contributed to the education of the Dauphin, for which he received an annual pension of 800 pounds as a reward for his Théâtre de la dernière guerre qu'il a eu l'honneur de présenter à Sa Majesté (Theatre of the Last War which he had the honour of presenting to His Majesty).
