= Diego Bernardo de Peredo y Navarrete =

Mexican Roman Catholic clergyman

Diego Bernardo de Peredo y Navarrete or Diego de Peredo (3 April 1696, León de Mechoacán, Guanajuato - 21 March 1774, San Juan Bautista, Tabasco) was a Mexican Roman Catholic clergyman who became bishop of Yucatán. A street in the city centre of Villahermosa, Tabasco is now named after him.

== Life ==
Born in the village of León de Mechoacán in Guanajuato, he studied at the Valladolid seminary in Michoacán. He was ordained priest in 1765 and consecrated in the Cathedral of Valladolid de Michoacán in 1766.

In 1767 he arrived in Cartagena de Indias, Colombia, and on 22 June 1772 he was promoted to bishop of Yucatán During his episcopate, he was commissioned to carry out a census of the province, so in 1772 he published a document entitled "Nota historial sobre los pueblos y villas de la Provincia de Yucatán" (Historical note on the villages and towns of the Province of Yucatán).

During a pastoral visit to Tabasco Province, then attached to that of Yucatán, he fell seriously ill in its capital San Juan Bautista (today the city of Villahermosa). Three days before his death, he left to the town of San Juan Bautista a replica of the "Black Christ of Esquipulas" which he had brought from Esquipulas in Guatemala - he had been carrying it with him and had promised to build a chapel to house it. He died on 21 March 1774 in the capital of Tabasco.

The inhabitants of San Juan Bautista began to build a church for the image on 15 January 1775 and inaugurated it exactly a year later It was named the Church of Our Lord of Esquipulas (iglesia del Señor de Esquipulas). It was promoted to a cathedral in 1882, changing its name to Cathedral of Our Lord of Esquipulas (Catedral del Señor de Esquipulas).

== External links and additional sources ==
- Cheney, David M. "Archdiocese of Yucatán". Catholic-Hierarchy.org. (for Chronology of Bishops) ^{[self-published]}
- Chow, Gabriel. "Metropolitan Archdiocese of Yucatán". GCatholic.org. (for Chronology of Bishops) ^{[self-published]}
- Diego Bernardo de Peredo v Navarrete on catholic-hierarchy.org ^{[self-published]}

== Bibliography ==
- (in Spanish) De la Peña Marshall, Ricardo (2013). Villahermosa y su historia (1ra. ed.). Villahermosa, Tabasco.: Ricardo de la Peña Marshall. ISBN 978-607-00-6980-2.
- (in Spanish) Gil y Saenz, Manuel (1979). Consejo Editorial del Gobierno del Estado de Tabasco (ed.). Compendio Histórico, Geográfico y Estadístico del Estado de Tabasco (2nd. ed.). Naucalpan, Edo. de México: Edimex, S.A. de C.V. OCLC 7281861.
- (in Spanish) Torruco Saravia, Geney (1987). H. Ayuntamiento Constitucional del Municipio de Centro (ed.). Villahermosa Nuestra Ciudad (1st ed.). Villahermosa, Tabasco: Editorial Usumacinta. OCLC 253403147.
