= Giovanni Battista Boccabadati =

Italian lawyer, mathematician, engineer and writer

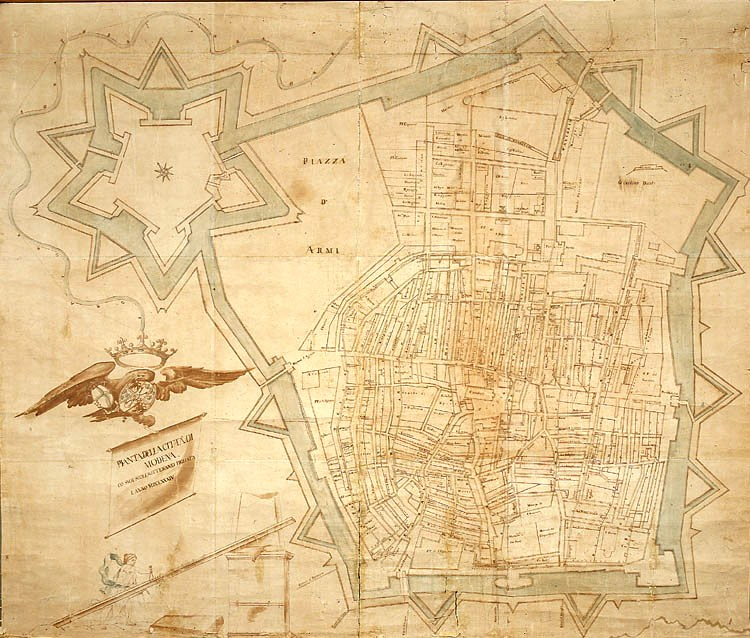
Boccabadati's map of the city of Modena and its fortifications, 1684

Giovan Battista Boccabadati (February 1635 - October 17 1696) was a practising and teaching lawyer, mathematician, engineer and writer, especially of plays.

== Life and works ==
Giovan Battista was born in Modena to Adonio Boccabadati and Laura Gadaldini but was left an orphan as a young man. Later he lived for a short time in Carpi with his relative, Canon Raineri Boccabadati, returning on his death in 1649 to Modena. We know nothing of the studies that were to give him a wide literary, legal and scientific knowledge, nor where he gained his degree in civil and canon law. He was also to gain a reputation as a writer, beginning with poetry on political subjects in the 1650s and then from 1664 turning to drama. He died in Modena.

As well as practising law, Boccabadati was also involved in mathematical and scientific studies. It was this versatility that led the Duke of Modena to make him his librarian in 1671 and promote him to a readership in law at the new university college in 1678. In 1681 the Duke appointed him general engineer with a special allowance for the trips that he had to make to Brescello, which suggests that he was engaged in the work of widening and strengthening the fortress there so that it became the best equipped and strongest in the Duchy. Afterwards, he succeeded to new university positions teaching mathematics and physics. During this time too, Boccabadati was commissioned to make the first complete topographical map of Modena, a work in which he was employed for about six months; others by him are also known.

His writing for the theatre also continued and in 1693 he wrote his prose drama Scipione for the celebration of the marriage between Francesco d'Este and Margherita Farnese. This later formed the basis for Apostolo Zeno's libretto, Scipione nelle Spagne (1710), an opera set by various composers inside and outside Italy throughout the 18th century. Among other literary works by Boccabadati, there was a verse epithalamium for the wedding of the Marchese Filippo Rangoni (1760), later a great patron of opera, and two sonnets contributed to a publication celebrating the liberation of Vienna from Turkish attack in 1683.
