= Barthélemy Chasse =

Italian painter

- Born: 1659
- Died: 1720 (aged 60–61)
- Occupation: Painter

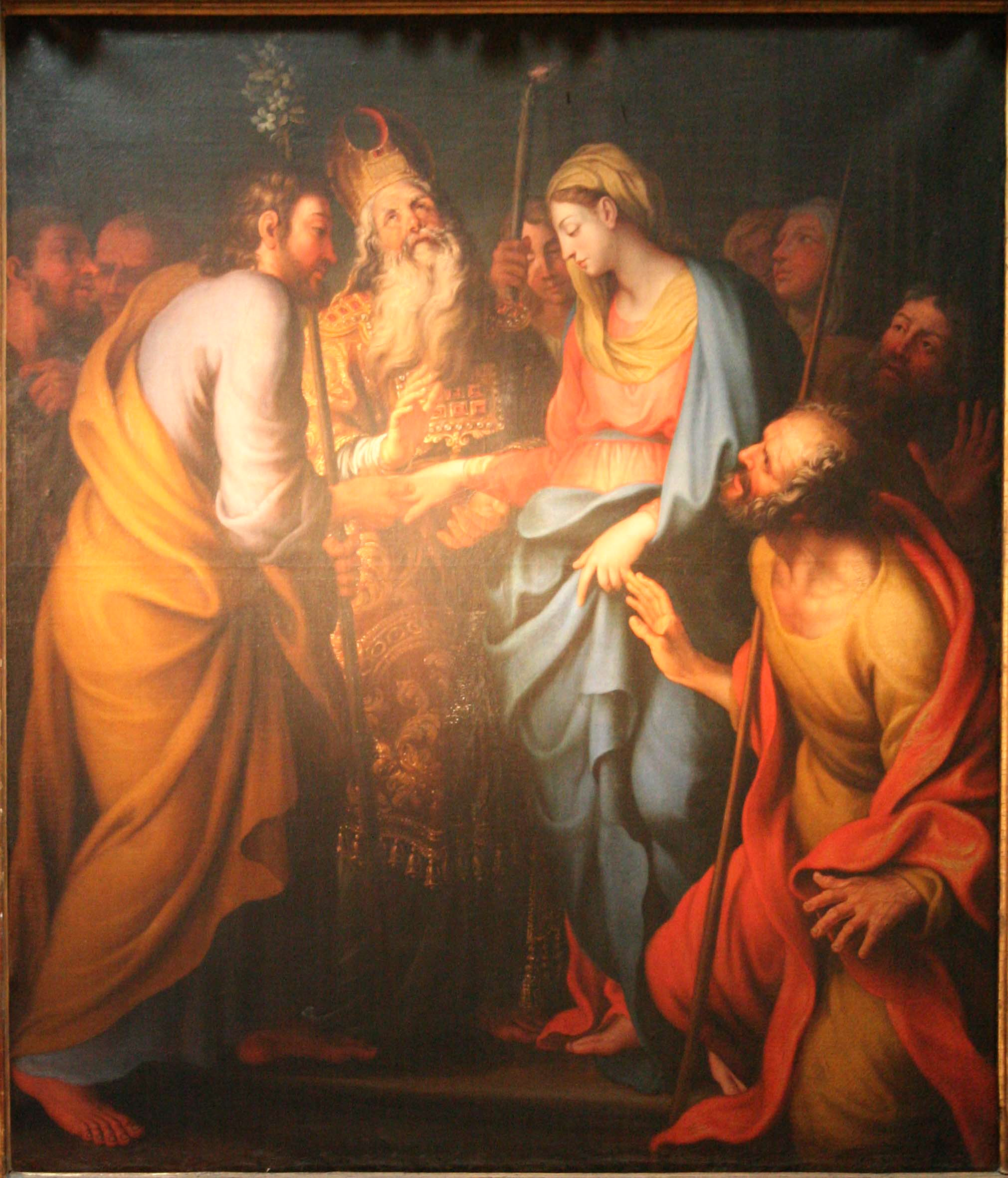
Marriage of the Virgin

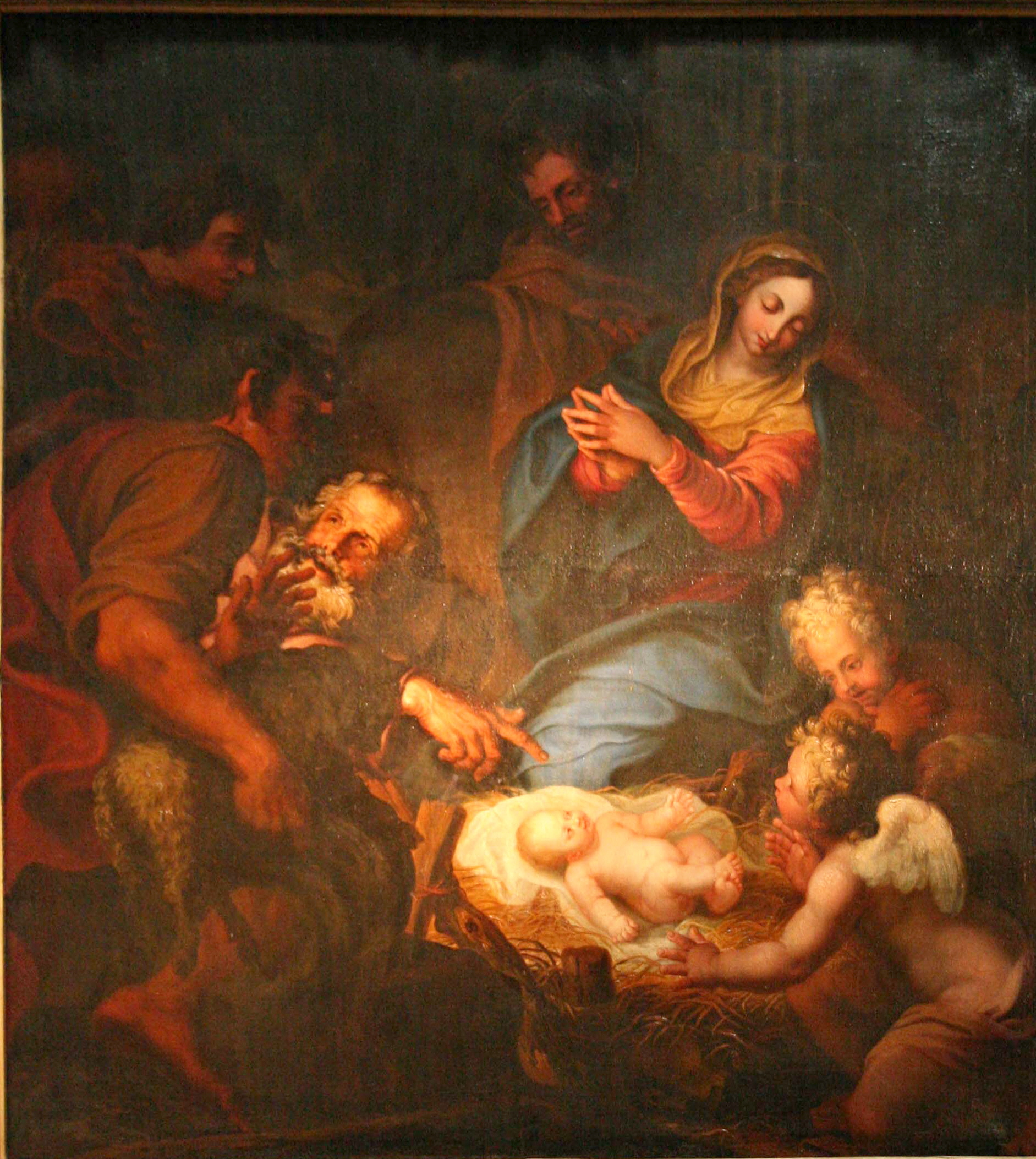
Adoration of the Shepherds

Barthélemy Chasse (1659–1720) was a Kingdom of Naples-born French painter.

== Biography ==
=== Early life ===
Barthélemy Chasse was born in 1659 in Naples, Kingdom of Naples.

=== Career ===
He moved to Marseille, where he became a religious painter. He sometimes worked alongside painter Michel Serre (1658–1733). He soon became the official painter of Bishop Henri François Xavier de Belsunce de Castelmoron (1671–1755). He painted three paintings for the Bishop's personal collection: Le déluge, La sortie de l'arche and Le sacrifice de Noé.

Some of his paintings can be found in Roman Catholic churches, mostly in or around Marseille. For example, four of his paintings are displayed in the Église Notre-Dame-du-Mont in Marseille: La fuite en Égypte, L'atelier de Nazareth, L'adoration des bergers and Le mariage de la Vierge. Additionally, his painting La Vierge, Saint-Sébastien, et Saint Clair is displayed in the Église Saint-Sébastien in Allauch

More of his paintings are displayed in the Musée des beaux-arts de Marseille.

=== Personal life ===
He got married in Marseille in 1689. He died in 1720 in Marseille.
