= Nicolas Roze (chevalier) =

French aristocrat, hero of 1720 plague epidemic in Marseille

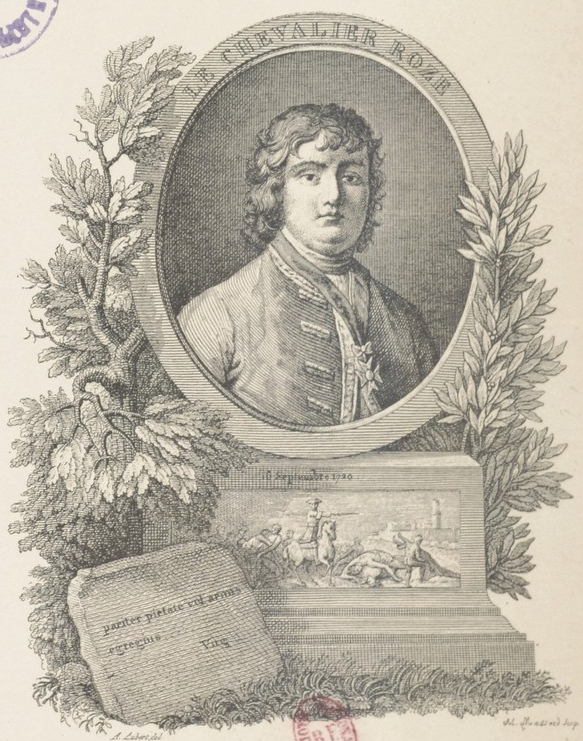
- Born: 1675; Marseille, France
- Died: 1733 (aged 57–58); Marseille
- Other names: Chevalier Roze

Nicolas Roze, better known as Chevalier Roze (Marseille, 1675-1733) was a French aristocrat. He is remembered for his heroism in 1720 during the Great Plague of Marseille.

== Biography ==
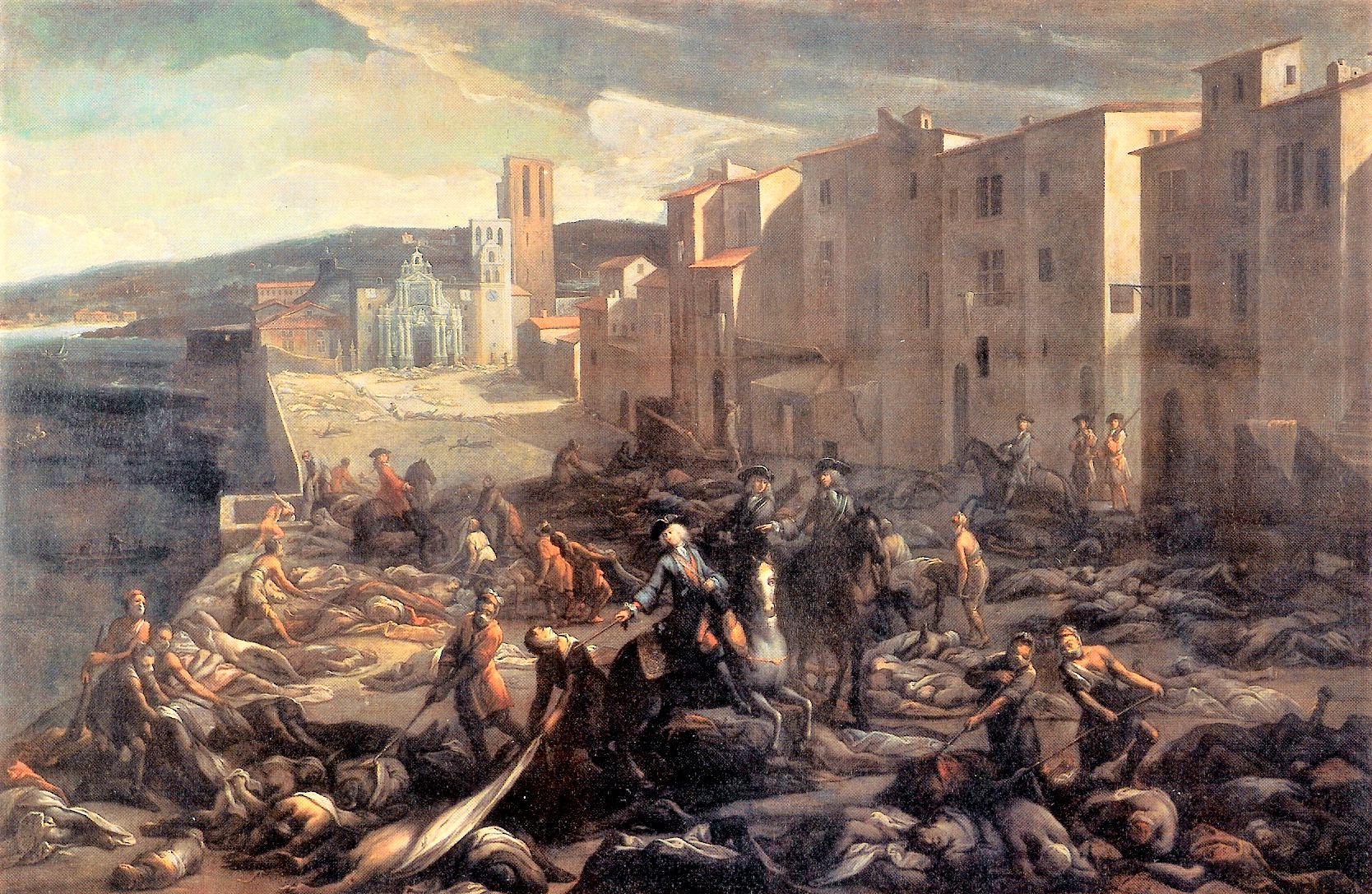
Chevalier Roze working at La Tourette during the heights of the plague. Painting by Michel Serre.

Nicolas Roze was born to a family of land owners from Solliès, Var. One of his ancestors, Antoine Roze, had moved to Marseille in 1580 to found a hostel. Roze's descendants would involve themselves in naval matters, notably as carpenters to build galleys. The street name "rue du Petit Chantier" is a legacy of the shipyard, known at the time as « l’Isle de Roze ».

Roze became a shipowner, trading from 1695 between Marseille and Alicante, where his brother Claude Roze was heading a merchant business. The same year, he married Claire Amiel, a baker. They had three children: Virginie, born on 5 June 1696, who grew to become a nun, and two boys who died in infancy.

During the War of Spanish Succession, Roze was wounded while commanding a military unit that he funded himself. Upon his return to Marseille, Louis XIV made him a Knight in the Order of Saint-Lazare, and bestowed him a 10,000 pound rent. He then acquired the moniker of "Chevalier Roze".

From 1716, Roze served as vice-consul of a factory on the Western coast of Peloponnese, under Consul Joseph Maillet. He was tasked with maintaining the port infrastructure, checking and protecting commerce, as well as sanitary policies in the face of frequent epidemics.

In 1720, at the onset of the Great Plague of Marseille, Roze proposed his services to the local authorities, the échevins. Strong with his experience from Greece, he was made General Commissioner for the Rive-Neuve neighbourhood. He established a quarantine by setting up checkpoints, and went as far as building gallows as a deterrence against looters. He also had five large mass graves dug out, converted La Corderie into a field hospital, and organised distribution of humanitarian supply to the population. He furthermore organised supply for the city itself.

On 16 September 1720, Roze personally headed a 150-strong group of volunteers and prisoners to remove 1200 corpses in the poor neighbourhood of the Esplanade de la Tourette. Some of the corpses were three weeks old and contemporary sources describe them as "hardly human in shape and set in movement by maggots". In half an hour, the corpses were thrown into open pits that were then filled with lime and covered with soil.

Out of 1,200 volunteers and prisoners deployed to fight the plague, only three survived. Roze himself caught the disease, but survived, although chances of survival without modern medicine are between 20 and 40%. He was later made governor of Brignoles in 1723.

After his first wife died, Chevalier Roze remarried with 17-year old Magdeleine Rose Labasset, while he was 47 himself. They lived in a building in rue Poids de la Farine, near the Canebière. Nicolas Roze died there on 2 September 1733.

== Legacy ==
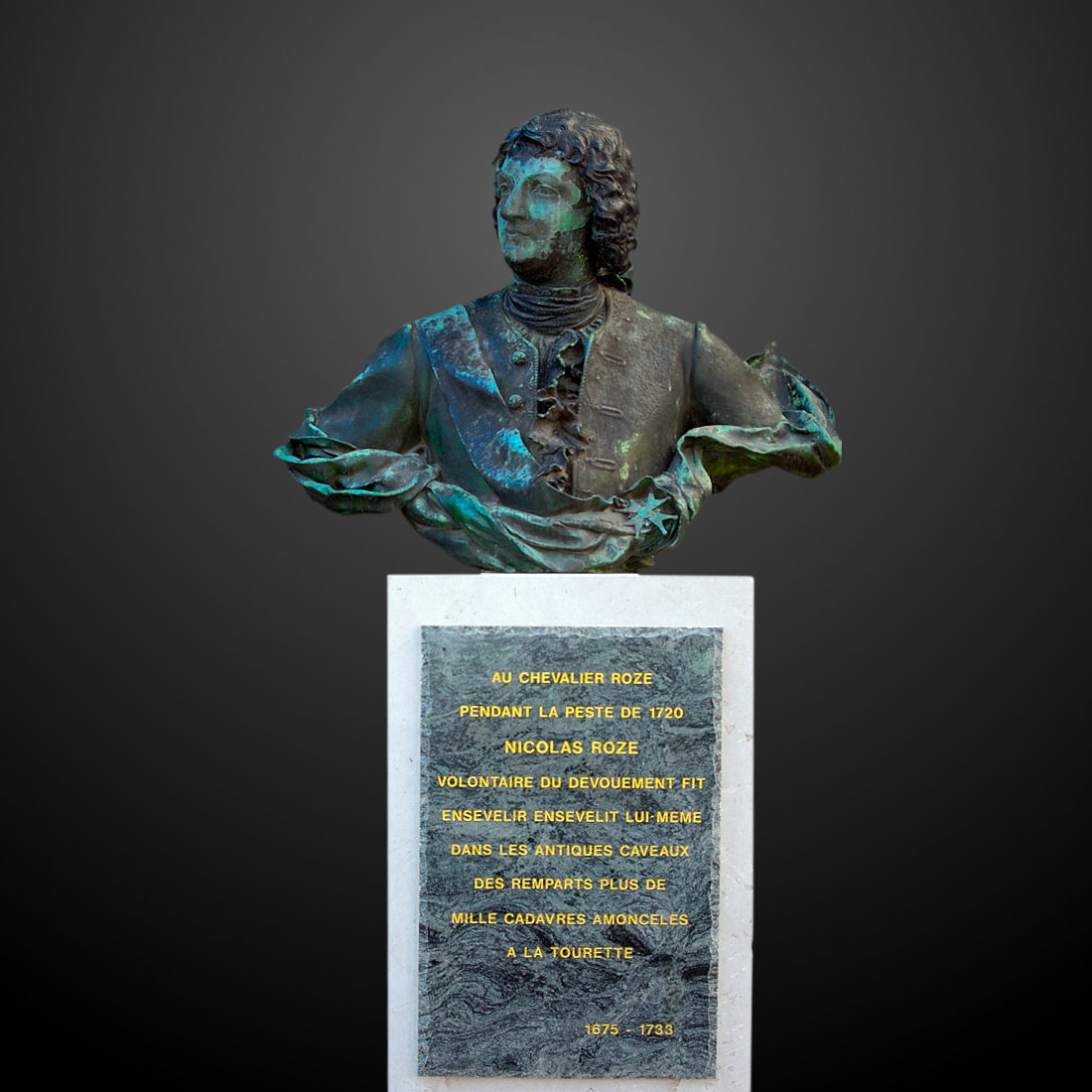
Bust of chevalier Roze at Marseille

The name of Roze was given in his honour to

- a street in the 2e arrondissement of Marseille;
- the Southern turn of stade Vélodrome, in Marseille.

In 1886, a bronze bust by Jean-Baptiste Hugues (1849-1930) was installed on Esplanade de la Tourette. It was moved behind Vieux-Port at rue de la Loge in 1936, moved again after the Second World War to place Fontaine Rouvier, and then to île de Ratonneau, in the yard of Hôpital Caroline which used to host quarantined travellers. In March 2017, the bust was restored to its original setting on Esplanade de la Tourette.

Roze is mentioned by Victor Hugo in Les Misérables.

== Bibliography ==
- Thèse de L. Robert Potet, Le Chevalier Roze, Éditions du Vieux Marseille, Marseille, 1933. L. Robert Potet, était lui-même Chevalier de Saint-Lazare de Jérusalem.
- H. Carrière, M. Condarié, F. Rebuffat, Marseille Ville Morte, Maurice Garçon Éditeur., 1968
- Patrick Mouton, La Mort est Venue de la Mer, Edition Pen Duick, 1982. L’auteur an effectué de nombreuses plongées sur l’épave du « Grand Saint Antoine » à l'entrée de la rade de Marseille
