= Église Notre-Dame-du-Mont =

Church in Marseille

Coordinates: 43.2917°N 5.3853°E

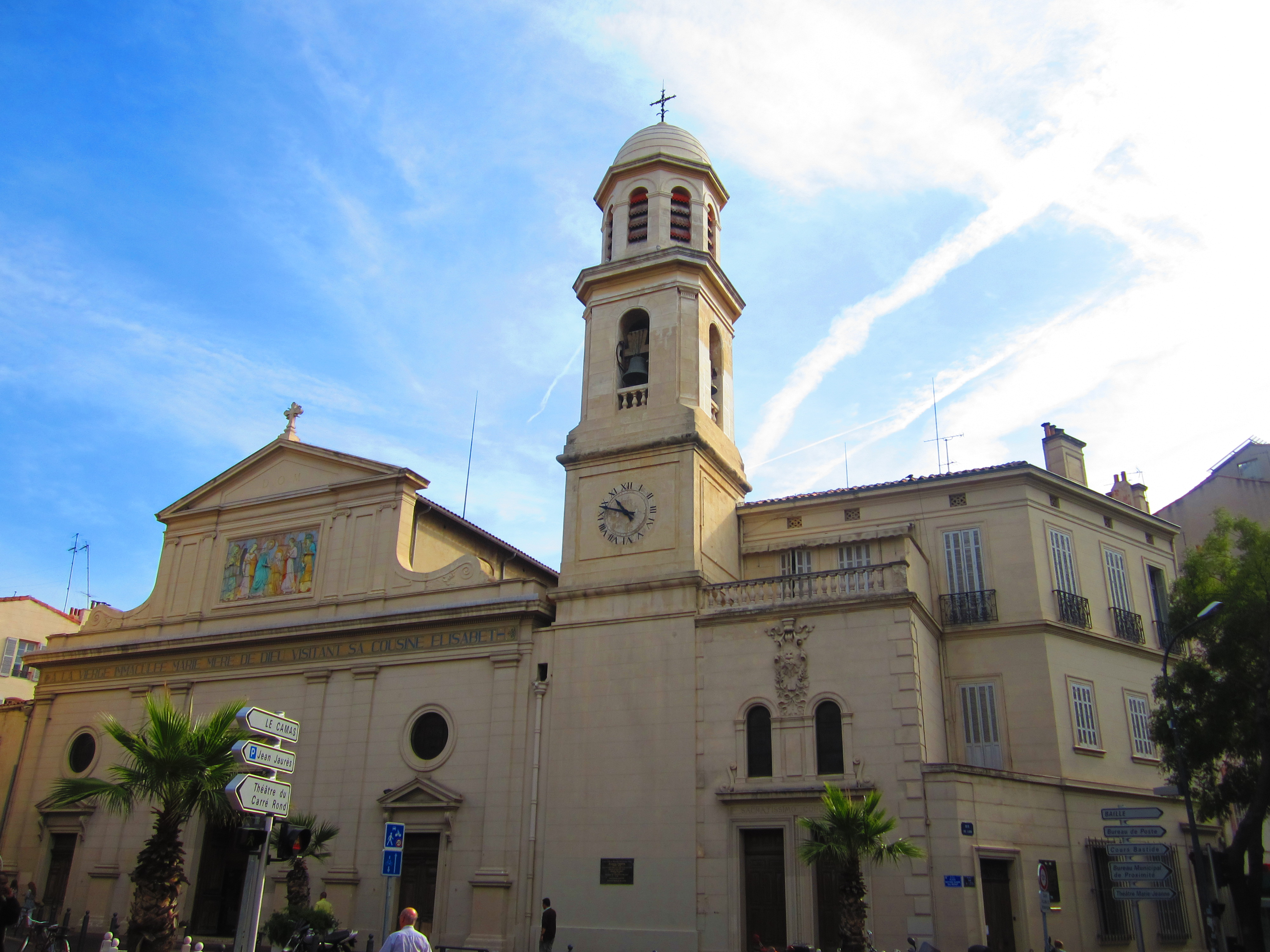
- Facade of the Église Notre-Dame-du-Mont
- Église Notre-Dame-du-Mont
- Location: 1 rue de Lodi; Marseille 13006; Bouches-du-Rhône, Provence-Alpes-Côte d'Azur
- Country: France
- Denomination: Roman Catholic Church

Architecture
- Architectural type: church
- Style: Neoclassical
- Completed: 1824

Administration
- Diocese: Roman Catholic Archdiocese of Marseille

Clergy
- Vicar: Jean-Paul Sorragi

The Église Notre-Dame-du-Mont is a Roman Catholic church in Marseille.

== Location ==
It is located in the 6th arrondissement of Marseille. The exact address is 1 rue de Lodi in Marseille. It is also located on a town square called Place Notre-Dame-du-Mont.

== History ==
A smaller church was built in 1586, where sailors would bring their ex-votos. Over time, this tradition was moved to Notre-Dame de la Garde.

In 1823–1824, the current church building was constructed in the neoclassical style.

In 1839, Frédéric Chopin (1810-1849) played on the pipe organ inside the church, which is still there.

It has four paintings by Barthélemy Chasse (1659-1720): La fuite en Égypte, L'atelier de Nazareth, L'adoration des bergers and Le mariage de la Vierge. It also has one painting by Dominique Papety (1815–1849): Christ en majesté.

== At present ==
The church building is open every day from 10AM to 12PM, and from 4PM to 6PM. Mass is said every weekday at 8:30AM, every Saturday at 6:30PM, and every Sunday at 10AM. The rosary takes place every at 5:30PM except Sundays, and the vespers take place every Wednesday at 7PM.

The current vicar is Fr Jean-Paul Sorragi, and the deacon is Philippe Chollat.

== Gallery ==
Église Notre-Dame-du-Mont
Map of the church

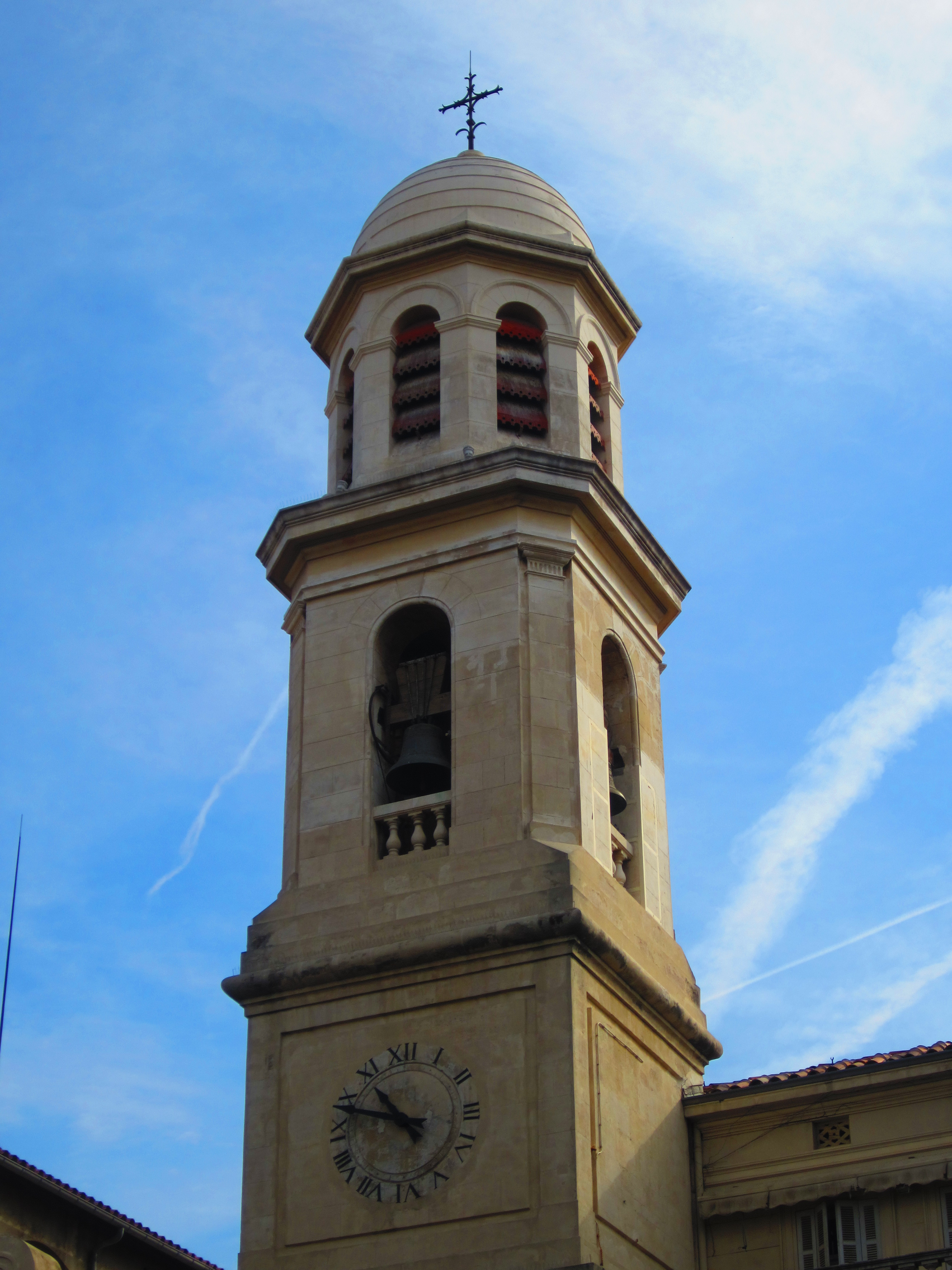
Bell tower of the Église Notre-Dame-du-Mont

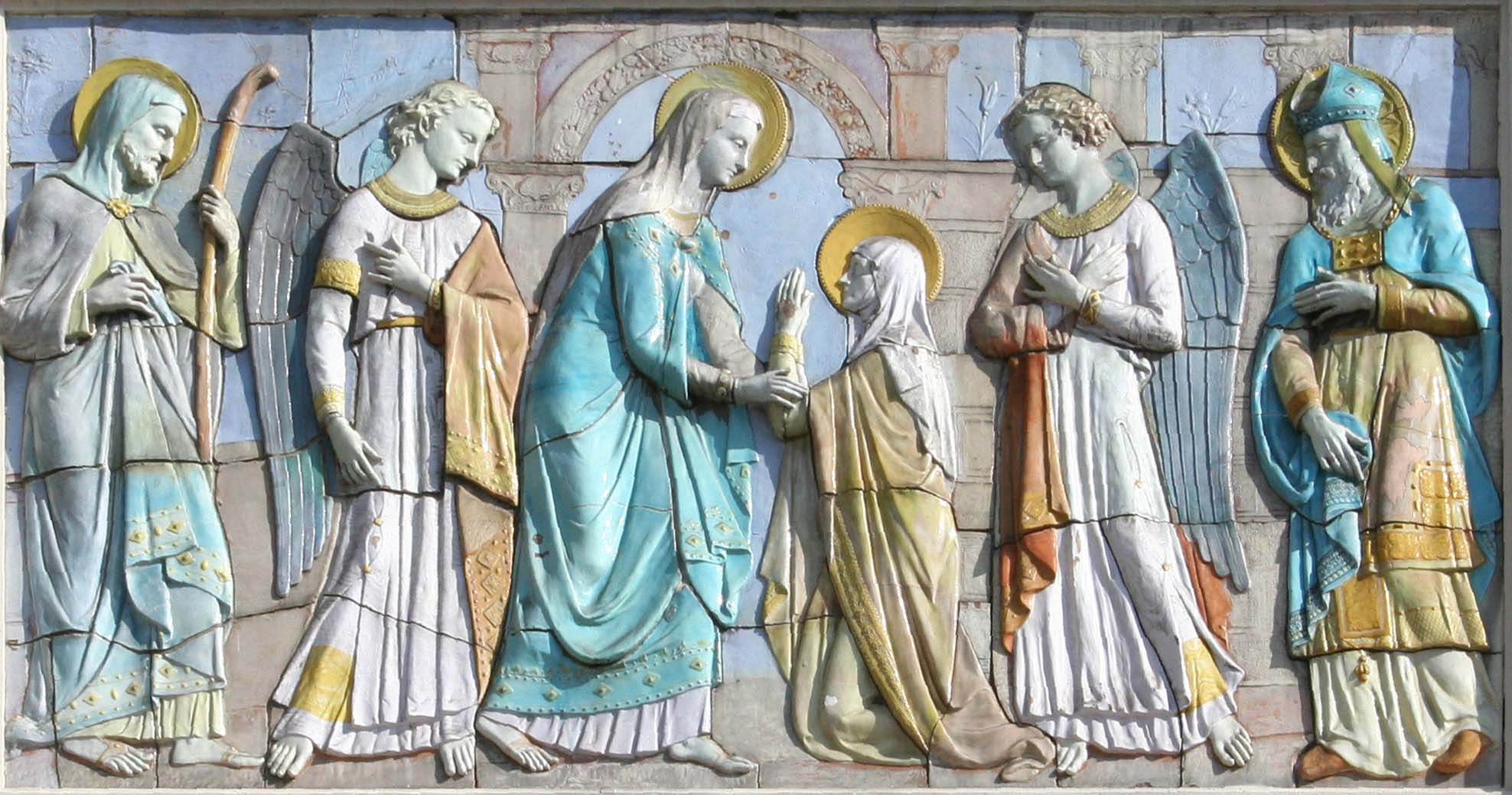
Ceramic sculpture on the facade of the Église Notre-Dame-du-Mont

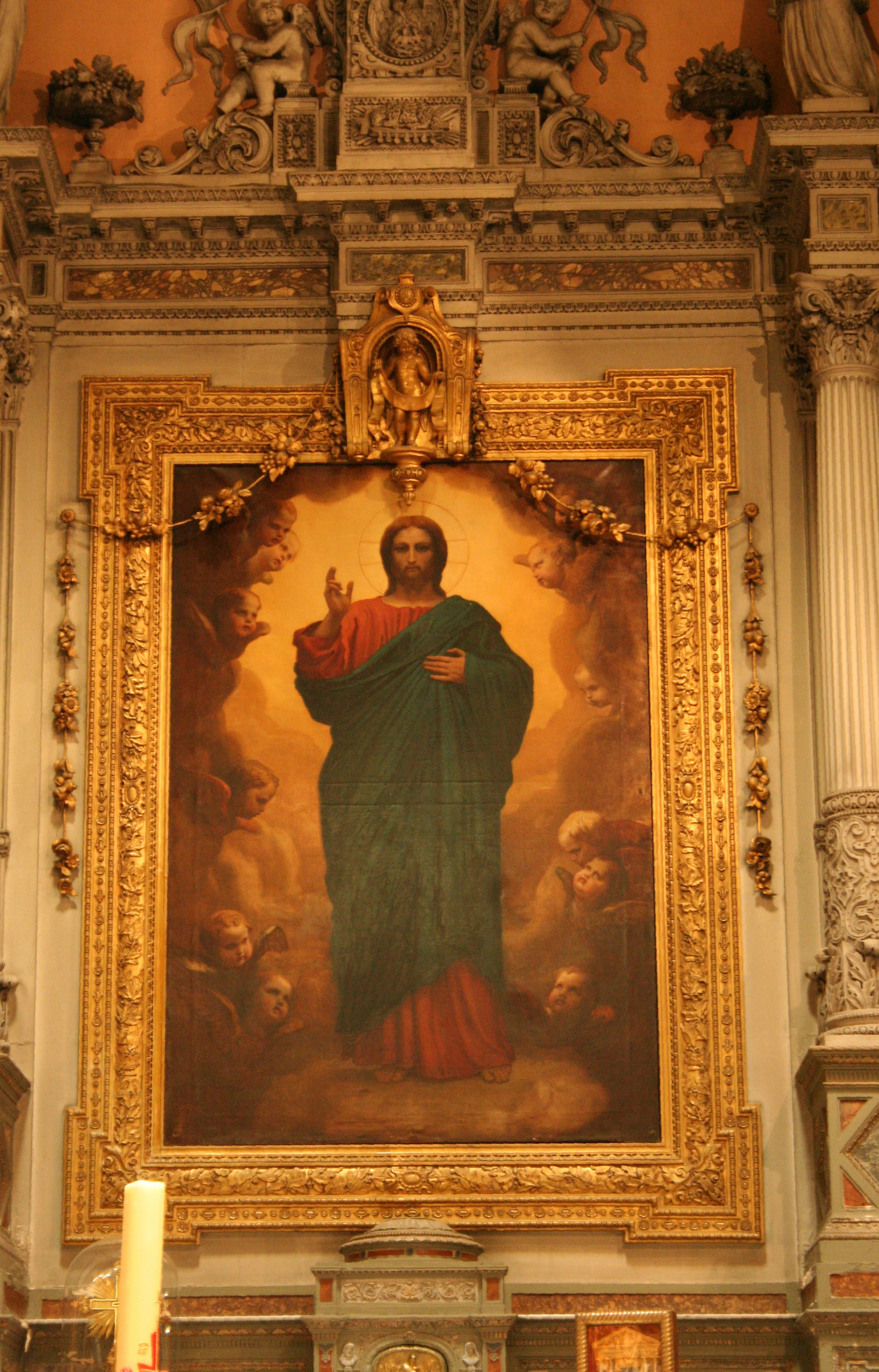
Christ en majesté by Dominique Papety inside the Église Notre-Dame-du-Mont
