= Henri François Xavier de Belsunce de Castelmoron =

French Jesuit and bishop

The Most Reverend Henri François Xavier de Belsunce de Castelmoron S.J.
- Bishop of Marseille
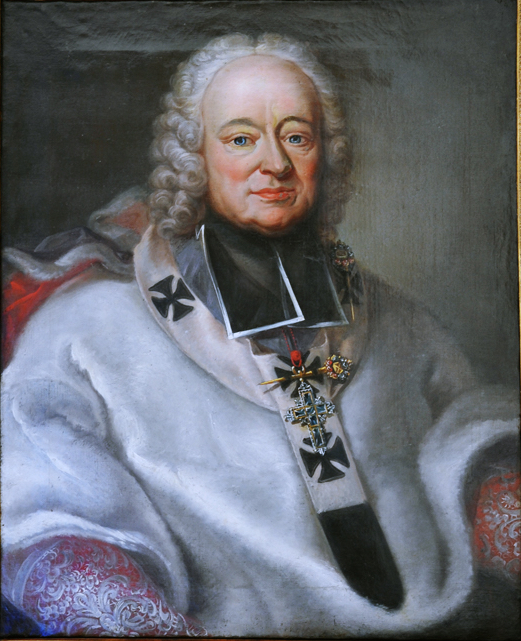
- Church: Roman Catholic Church
- Diocese: Marseille
- Appointed: 5 April 1709
- Term ended: 4 June 1755
- Predecessor: Bernard de Poudenx
- Successor: Jean-Baptiste de Belloy

Orders
- Consecration: 30 March 1710 by Louis Antoine de Noailles

Personal details
- Born: 9 December 1670 Château de la Force; Prigonrieux, Périgord, Kingdom of France
- Died: 4 June 1755 (aged 84) Marseille, Provence, Kingdom of France

Henri François Xavier de Belsunce de Castelmoron (3 December 1671 – 4 June 1755) was a French Jesuit who served as Bishop of Marseille from 1709 until his death. He is remembered for his tireless efforts to relieve the suffering during the Great Plague of Marseille of 1720–21.

== Early life ==
He was the second son of Armand de Belsunce, Marquis de Castelmoron, and his wife Anne de Caumont de Lausun. His maternal uncle was courtier and soldier Antoine Nompar de Caumont, Duke of Lauzun. His Huguenot parents thought it more advantageous for him to be raised a Catholic.

Henri studied classics in Paris at the Collège de Clermont or the Lycée Louis-le-Grand and converted to Catholicism at about the age of fifteen. He then entered the Society of Jesus. In 1699 he left the Society for reasons of health and became Vicar-General of Agen.

The Vie de Suzanne de Foix, a biography of his aunt, was written by him and published while at Agen, 1709. That same year he was made Bishop of Marseille.

== Bishop ==
As bishop, Belsunce reorganized the lay confraternities, promoted pilgrimages, and led processions. For him, religion was a community affair. In April 1718, he established the Association of Perpetual Adoration of the Sacred Heart in Marseilles; its statutes were drafted by Visitation nun (later Venerable) Anne-Madeleine Remuzat, whom the bishop had received into the congregation as a novice.

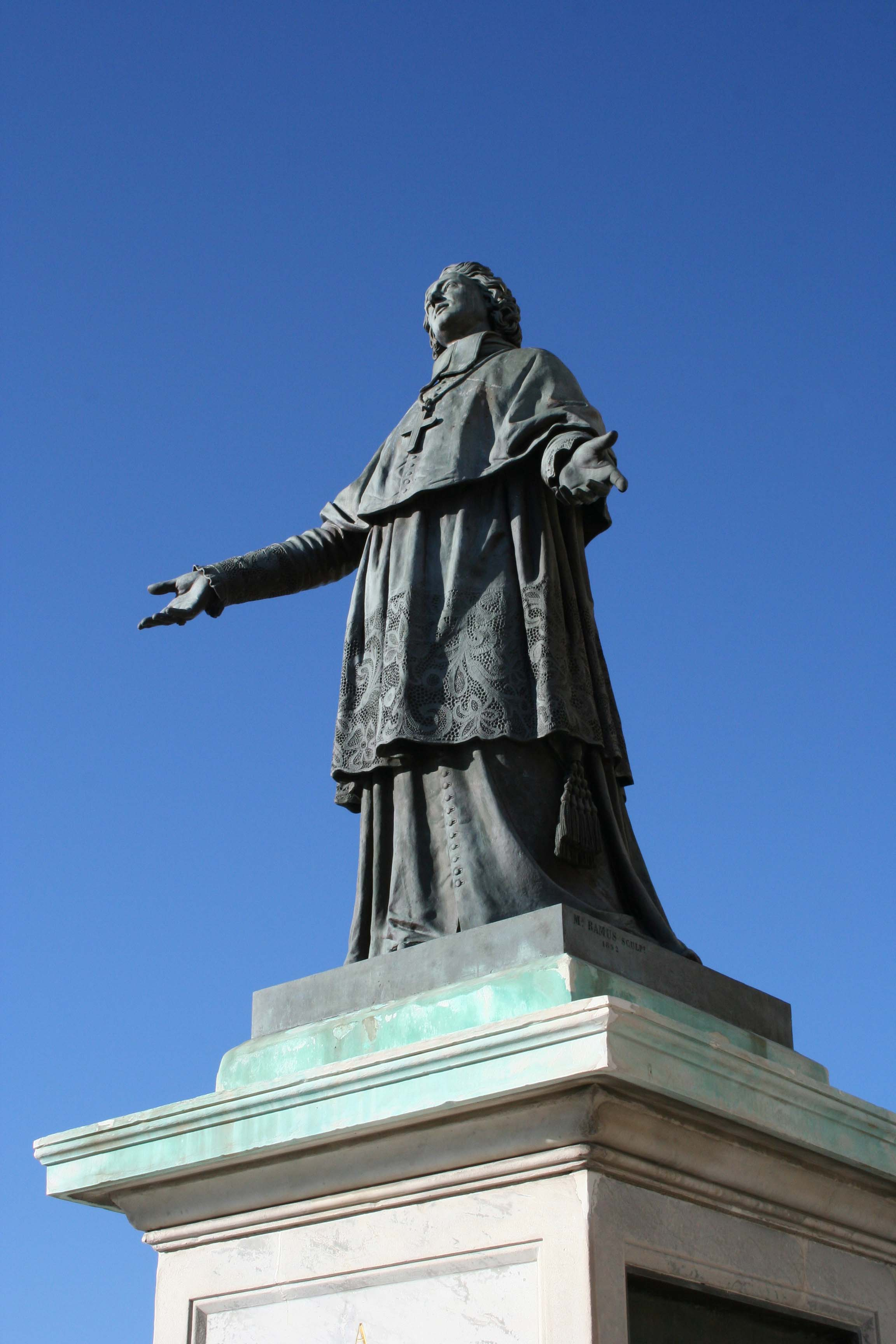
Bishop Belsunce, Marseille Cathedral

== The plague ==
The charity he displayed during the Great Plague of Marseille of 1720 and 1721 which killed 100,000 people in Marseille, made his name a household word and won for him the title of "Good Bishop". When the plague broke out a large fleet was taking the Princess of Orléans to Italy where she was to marry the Duke of Modena. The suite of the princess took to flight, and with them all the notables of the city, but Bishop Belsunce remained with a few friends, and together they battled against the plague, till they conquered it.

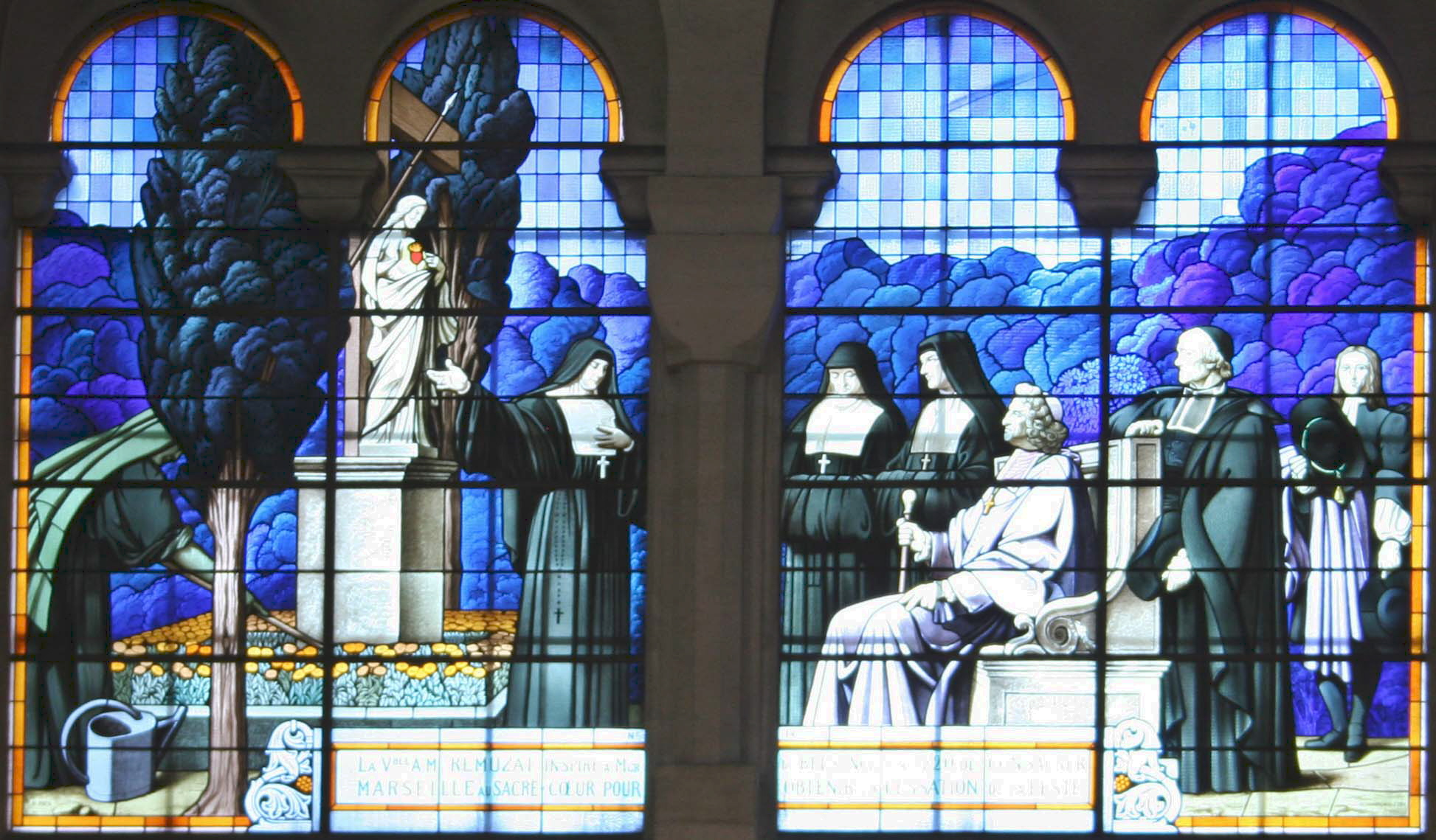
Belsunce consecrating Marseille to the sacred heart in 1720 to obtain an end to the plague

The bishop went three times on foot to the chapel at Notre-Dame de la Garde on September 28, December 8, 1720; and August 13, 1721 to bless the inhabitants of the city. In the midst of the plague, on 22 October 1720, at the suggestion of Soeur Anne-Madeleine, Belsunce established a feast in honour of the Sacred Heart. On 1 November he solemnly consecrated the city and the Diocese to the Sacred Heart of Jesus.

In his address to the Assembly of the Clergy in 1725, Belsunce stated that more than 250 priests and religious perished at that time. But he was the soul of the rescuers and the praises bestowed on him by Alexander Pope and Charles Hubert Millevoye (Essay on Man and Belsunce ou la peste de Marseille) were deserved.

The King of France offered him, by way of recognition, the See of Laon to which was attached the first ecclesiastical peerage of the realm and afterwards the metropolitan See of Bordeaux. Belsunce refused both and contented himself with accepting the pallium sent him by Pope Clement XII.

Nicolas-André Monsiau painted The Devotion of Monsignor de Belsunce during the plague of 1720 (1819). François Gérard painted Monsignor of Belsunce during the plague of Marseille The eveque Henri Francois Xavier de Belsunce-Castelmoron (Belsunce Castelmoron) (1671-1755) rescuing the sick during the plague epidemic of 1720 (1834).

There is a bronze statue of Belsunce in the square outside the Cathédrale Sainte-Marie-Majeure de Marseille commemorating his work during the plague. During the occupation of World War II, knowing that the Germans were looking for non-ferrous metals, resistance fighters hid the 2800 kg of bronze of the statue in a warehouse on Boulevard de Louvain. The Grand Cours was renamed the Cours Belsunce.

He is mentioned by Albert Camus in the novel The Plague, in the second sermon of Father Paneloux.

== Jansenism ==
During his incumbency Belsunce fought against Jansenism. He attended, 1727, the Synod of Embrun where Jean Soanen was condemned. He opposed with all his power Colbert of Pamiers. In spite of the protest of the Parlement of Aix-en-Provence, he instructed his priests to refuse absolution to the appellants against the Bull Unigenitus. Nearly all his pastoral instructions are against Jansenism.

== Works ==
In addition to various pastoral instructions, Belsunce's works include:

- Vie de Suzanne de Foix (Agen, 1709)
- Le combat chrétien (translated from Augustine of Hippo's De Agone Christiano)
- L'art de bien mourir (translated from Robert Bellarmine's De Arte Bene Moriendi)
- Antiquités de l'Eglise de Marseille (Marseilles, 1747–51)

All these writings were published by Jauffret under the title of Oeuvres de Belsunce (Metz, 1822).
