= Mur de la peste =

French wall in the Vaucluse mountains

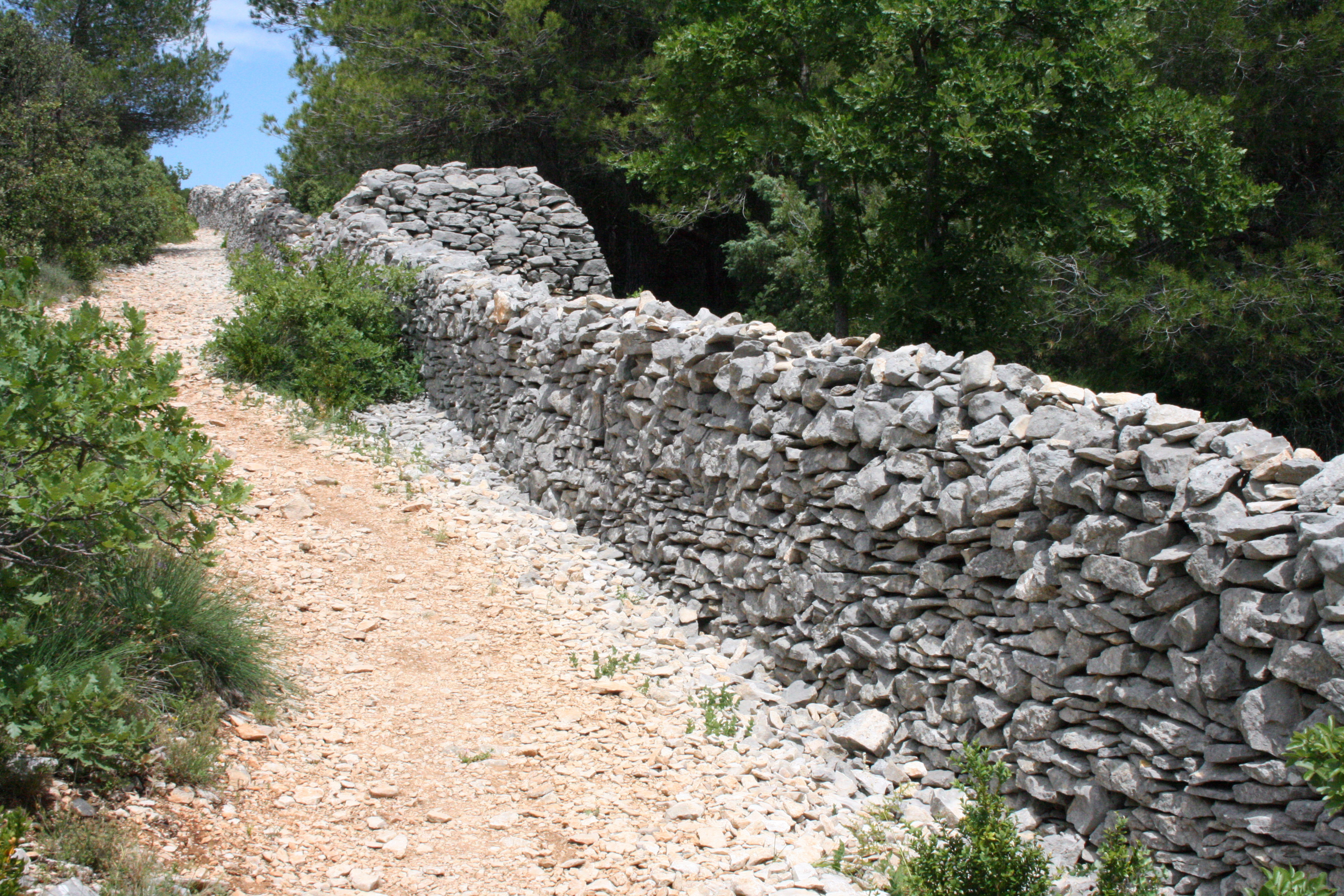
A modern reconstruction of the plague wall, in Cabrières-d'Avignon

The Mur de la peste (English: Plague Wall) is a wall built in the Vaucluse Mountains to protect the Comtat Venaissin from the plague that struck Marseille and part of Provence from 1720 to 1722.

== History ==
On May 25, 1720, a ship from Syria carrying fabric introduced the plague to Marseille. It spread to Toulon and then inland to Arles, Tarascon, Pertuis, Cucuron, and Apt. To stop the plague from spreading to the Comtat Venaissin, an enclave then part of the Papal States, representatives of the King of France and those of the Comtat made the decision to form a fortified line 100 kilometers long. A dry stone quarantine wall 1.95 metres (6 ft 5 in) high was built between March and July 1721 by 500 men. It was designed by Antoine d'Allemand, an architect from Carpentras. The constructed wall was over 100 kilometres (62 mi) long, going between Lagnes, Cabrières-d'Avignon, Murs, and Le Beaucet. The wall, which included dozens of towers, was guarded by 1,000 men who were ordered to shoot anyone who crossed it without permission. Those who passed through the wall underwent a medical examination to obtain a health certificate. If any showed signs of illness, their belongings were burned and they were quarantined outside the city. By January 1723, the plague had subsided after killing approximately 100,000 people and the wall was abandoned.

In the years after the abandonment of the wall, it was used as a source of stone for local construction. Since 1986, l'association Pierre Sèche en Vaucluse has worked to retrace the route of the wall and restore it. A loop trail was constructed allowing hiking along it starting from Cabrières-d'Avignon.
