= Jauffret =

Jauffret is a French surname. Notable people with the surname include:

- Louis-François Jauffret (1770–1840), French educator and fabulist.
- Jean-Paul Jauffret (born 1930), is a French wine maker, businessman, politician and tennis player.
- François Jauffret (born 1942), French tennis player
- Régis Jauffret (born 1955), French writer
