= Michel Serre =

Catalan-born French painter (1658–1733)

- Born: 10 January 1658; Tarragona, Catalonia, Spain
- Died: 10 October 1733 (aged 75); Marseille, Bouches-du-Rhône, Provence-Alpes-Côte d'Azur, France
- Occupation: Painter
- Spouse: Florie Régimonde
- Parent(s): Jacques Serre; Marie Barbos

Michel Serre (1658–1733) was a Catalan-born French painter.

== Biography ==
=== Early life ===
Michel Serre was born on 10 January 1658 in Tarragona, Spain. His father was Jacques Serre and his mother, Marie Barbos.

=== Career ===
As a painter, he specialized in baroque painting, religious paintings and the Great Plague of Marseille. Many of his paintings can be found in Roman Catholic churches in Provence.

In Marseille, three of his paintings are displayed in the Église Saint-Ferréol les Augustins: Sainte Marguerite, La Vierge à l'enfant apparaissant à Saint Pierre et Saint Paul. Another one is displayed in the Église des Chartreux: Madeleine enlevée par les anges. Three are displayed in the Église Saint-Matthieu de Château-Gombert: Le Christ roi, la Vierge et Saint-Joseph ou Le purgatoire, L'agonie de la Madeleine and Franciscains devant la Vierge ou apothéose de l'ordre de saint François. One painting, La vierge en prière dans l’atelier de Nazareth, is displayed in the Abbey of St. Victor, Marseille and two are displayed in the Église Saint-Cannat: La vierge à l’enfant et le purgatoire and La purification de la Vierge. Another one is displayed in the Église des Grands-Carmes: Cycle de la vie de la Vierge, while the Église Saint Roch in Mazargues is home to Apothéose de saint Roch. Moreover, the Église de la Pomme displays Annonciation, saint Jean-Baptiste et saint Étienne while the Église Saint-Sébastien in Allauch has Mort de Saint-Joseph and La fuite en Égypte.

In Aix-en-Provence, his painting entitled Apothéose de Saint-Augustin is displayed in the Église Saint-Jean-de-Malte while two other paintings, Le repas chez Simon le pharisien and Ex-voto de la peste can be seen in the Église de la Madeleine.

In Le Beausset, Var, the Chapelle Notre-Dame de Beauvoir is home to Le vœu de Mgr de Belsunce, representing Henri François Xavier de Belsunce de Castelmoron (1671–1755). In Saint-Maximin-la-Sainte-Baume, four of his paintings are displayed inside the Basilica of Sainte Marie Madeleine: L'enfant Jésus, Sainte-Anne, la Vierge et l’enfant jésus, Saint-Joseph, La Vierge à l'Enfant et le purgatoire and Saint-Thomas d’Aquin foudroyant l'hérésie.

In La Ciotat, two of his paintings, Vierge de grâces and Vierge de grâces et purgatoire, are displayed in the Église Notre-Dame. Moreover, in Draguignan, his painting Vierge donnant le scapulaire à Simon Stock can be seen inside the Église Saint-Michel. In Versailles, the Église Saint-Symphorien has one of his paintings, Les vendeurs chassés du temple, on display.

Some of his paintings are also found in museums. In the Villa Gaby Deslys in Marseille, formerly the private residence of Gaby Deslys, one can see his painting entitled La résurrection de Lazare. Also in Marseille, the Musée Grobet-Labadié displays Notre-Dame du bon voyage. Additionally, several of his paintings are displayed in the Musée des beaux-arts de Marseille: L’éducation de la Vierge, Présentation de la Vierge au temple, La visitation, Présentation de Jésus au temple, Jésus au temple parmi les docteurs, Saint-Benoît ressuscite un jeune moine mort, Cycle de la vie de Saint-François, Le martyre de Saint Pierre Vérone, Le miracle de Saint Hyacinthe, La vierge à l'enfant, Saint-François de Sales, and Sainte Jeanne de Chantal. In Aix-en-Provence, the Musée Granet displays one of his paintings: La vierge à l’enfant, moine bénédictin, Sainte félicité et Perpétue.

Louis XIV (1638–1715) appointed him as official painter of French galleys.

=== Personal life ===
On 1 May 1685 he married Florie Régimonde, daughter of Jean Régimonde et de Jeanne Montaignon, in the Église Notre-Dame-des-Accoules in Marseille.

He died on 10 October 1733 in Marseille. He was buried in the Église Saint-Ferréol les Augustins in Marseille.

=== Legacy ===
- The Rue Michel Serre in the 16th arrondissement of Marseille is named in his honour.

== Bibliography ==
- Pierre Parrocel, Le peintre Michel Serre et ses tableaux relatifs à la peste de Marseille (1901 – 11 pages).
- Marie-Claude Homet, Michel Serre et la peinture baroque en Provence (1658–1733) (Edisud, 1987, 197 pages).

== Gallery ==
Michel Serre
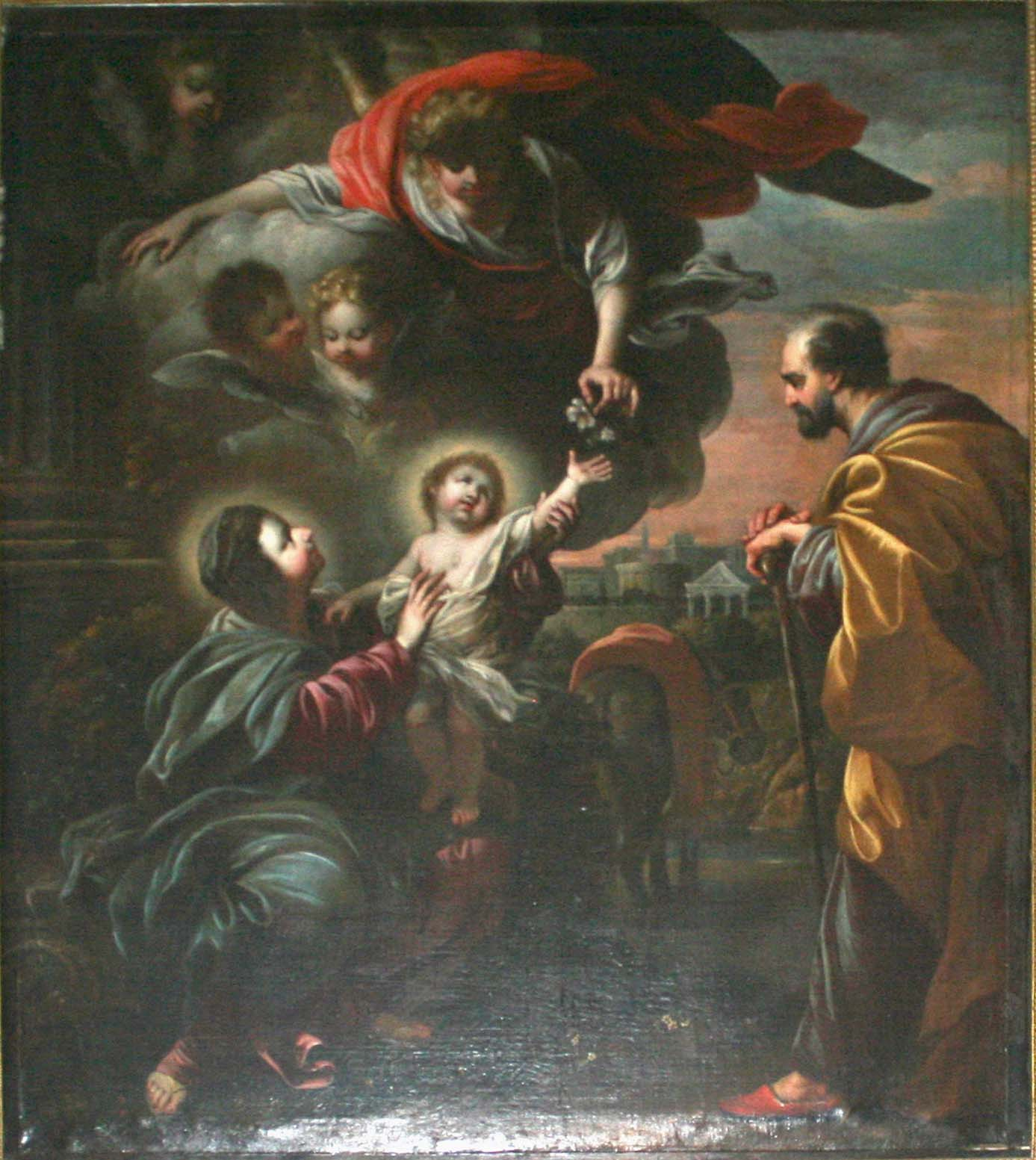
Le repos pendant la fuite en Égypte inside the Église Saint-Ferréol les Augustins in Marseille

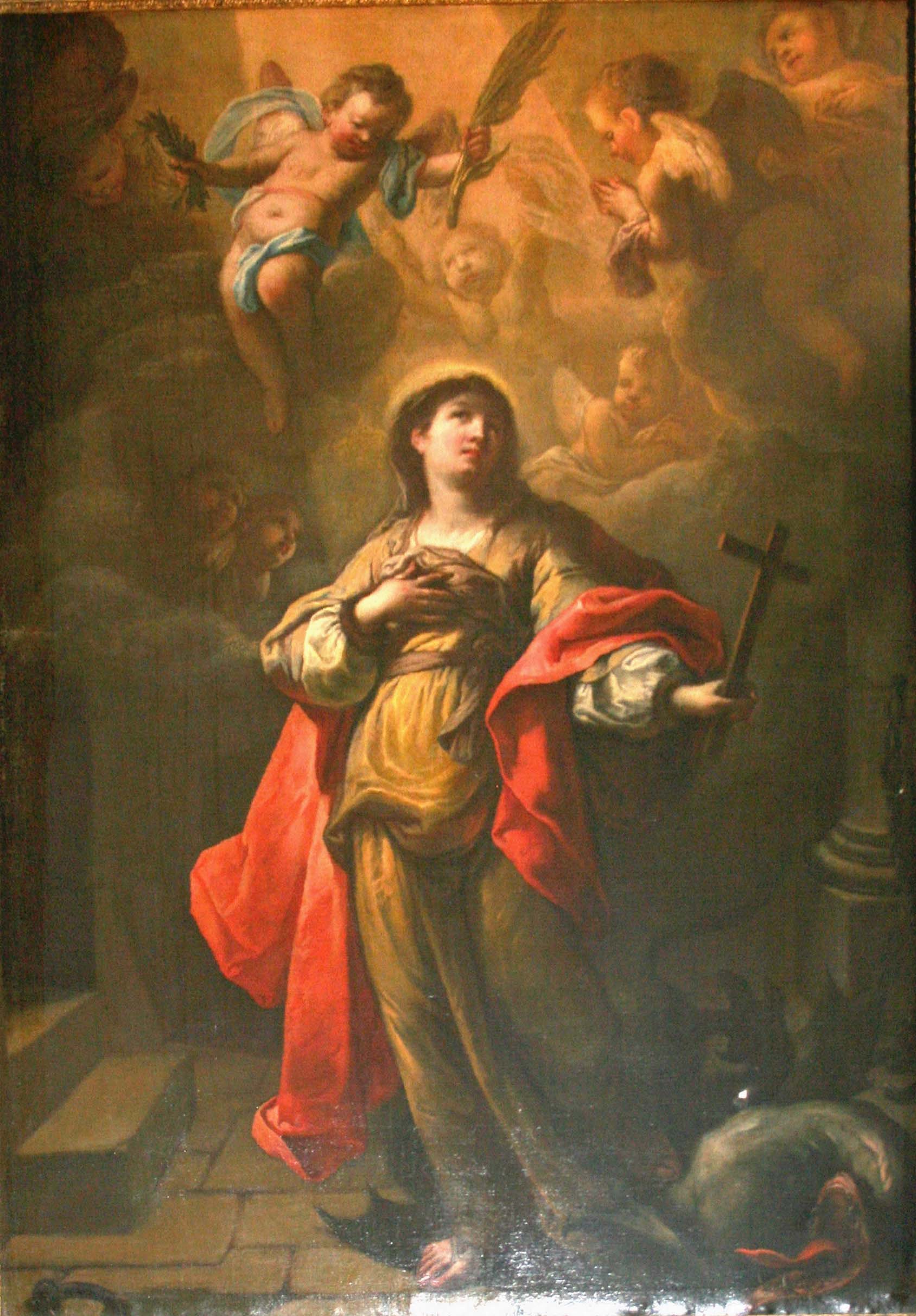
Sainte Marguerite inside the Église Saint-Ferréol les Augustins in Marseille

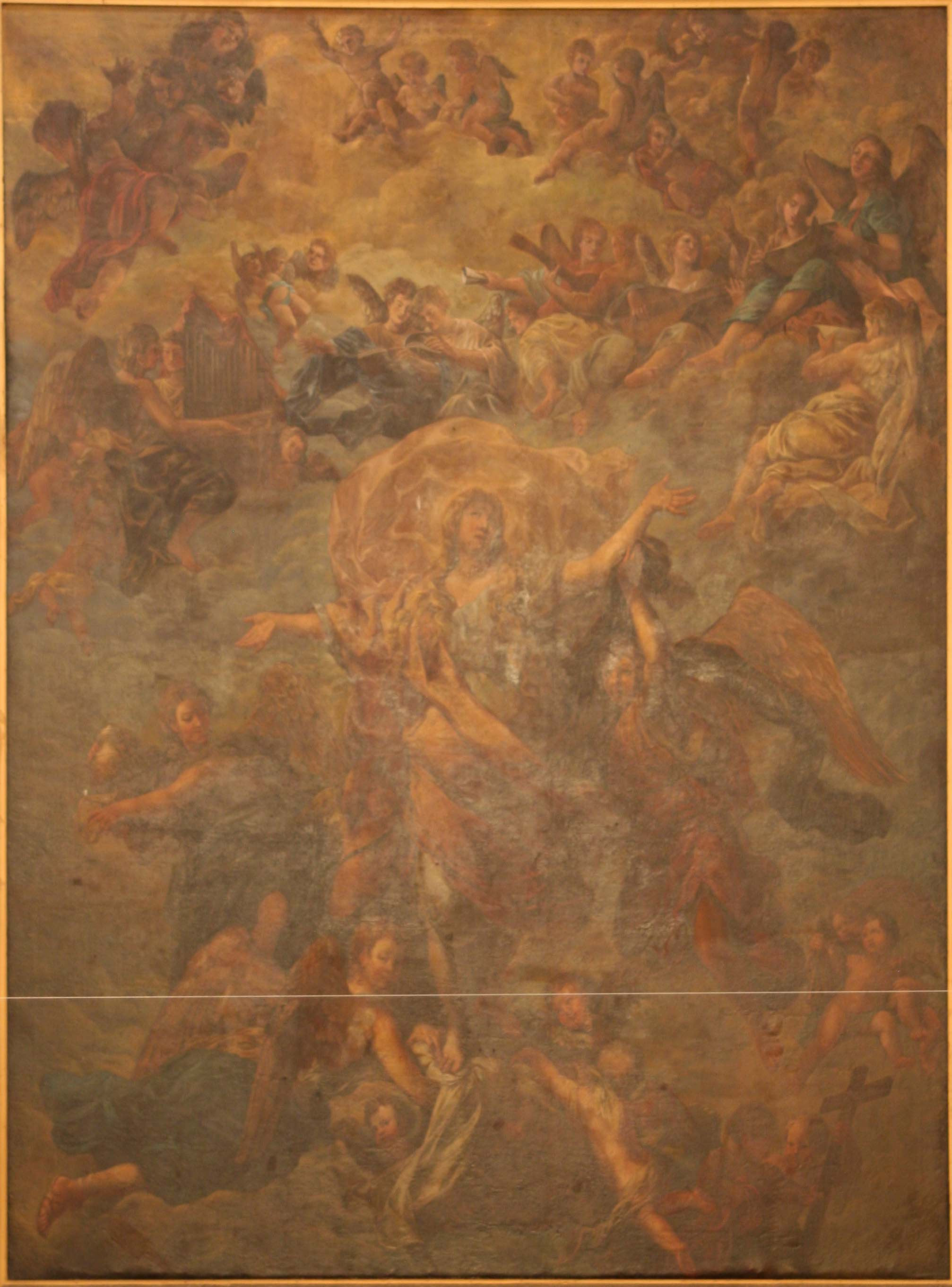
Madeleine enlevée par les anges inside the Église des Chartreux in Marseille

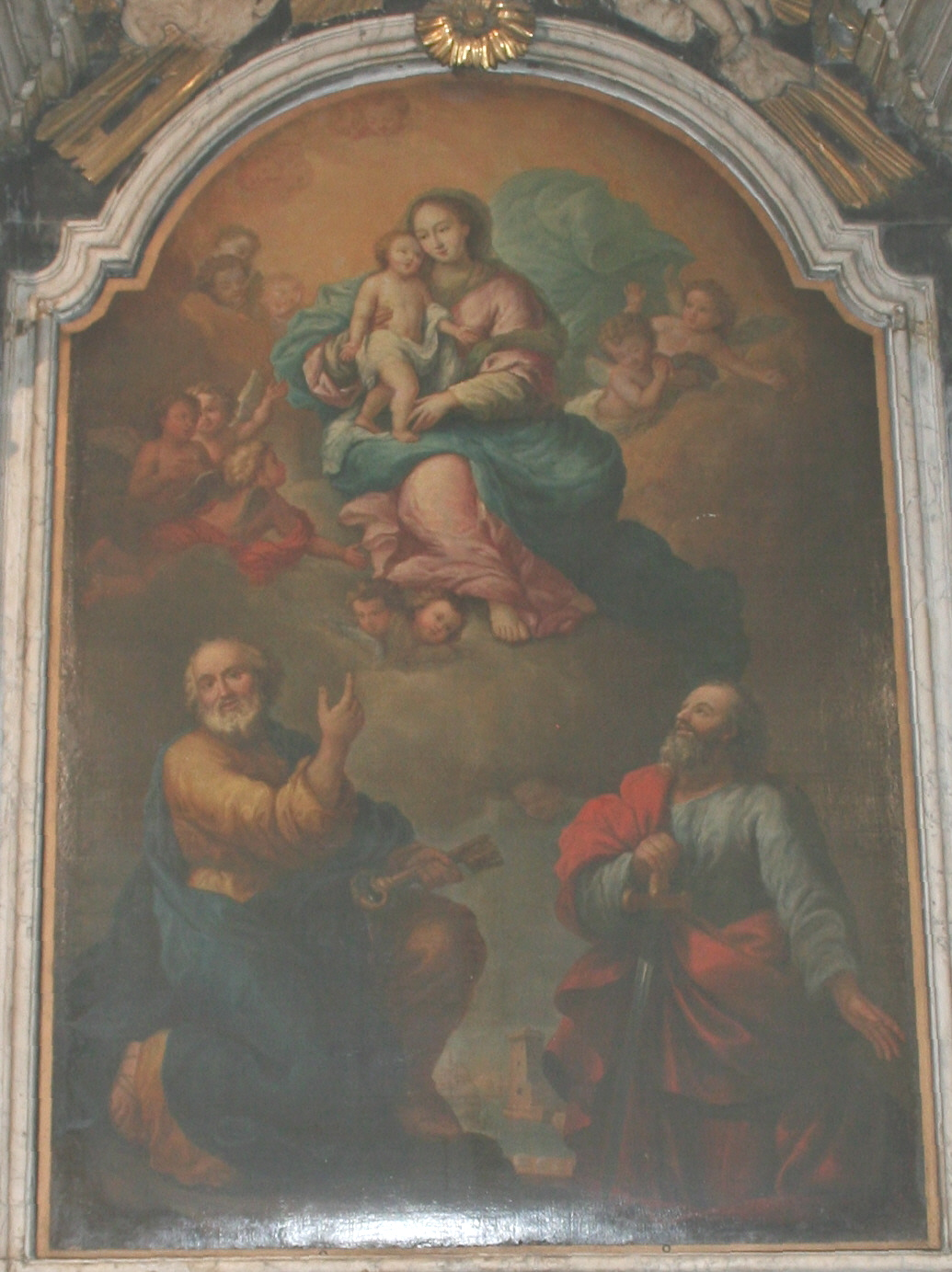
La Vierge à l'enfant apparaissant à Saint Pierre and Saint Paul inside the Église Saint Roch in Mazargues

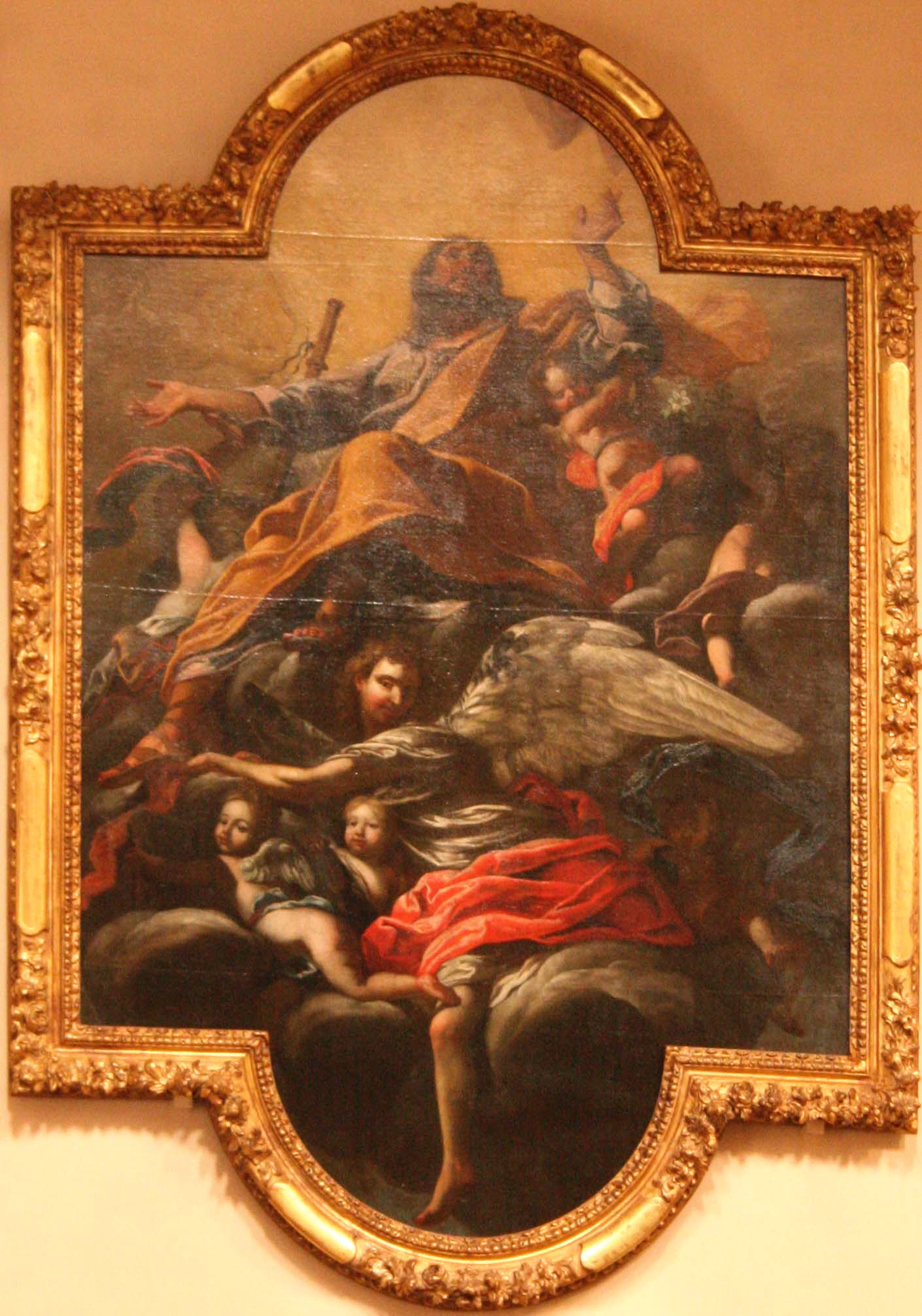
Painting inside the Église Saint Roch in Mazargues, Marseille

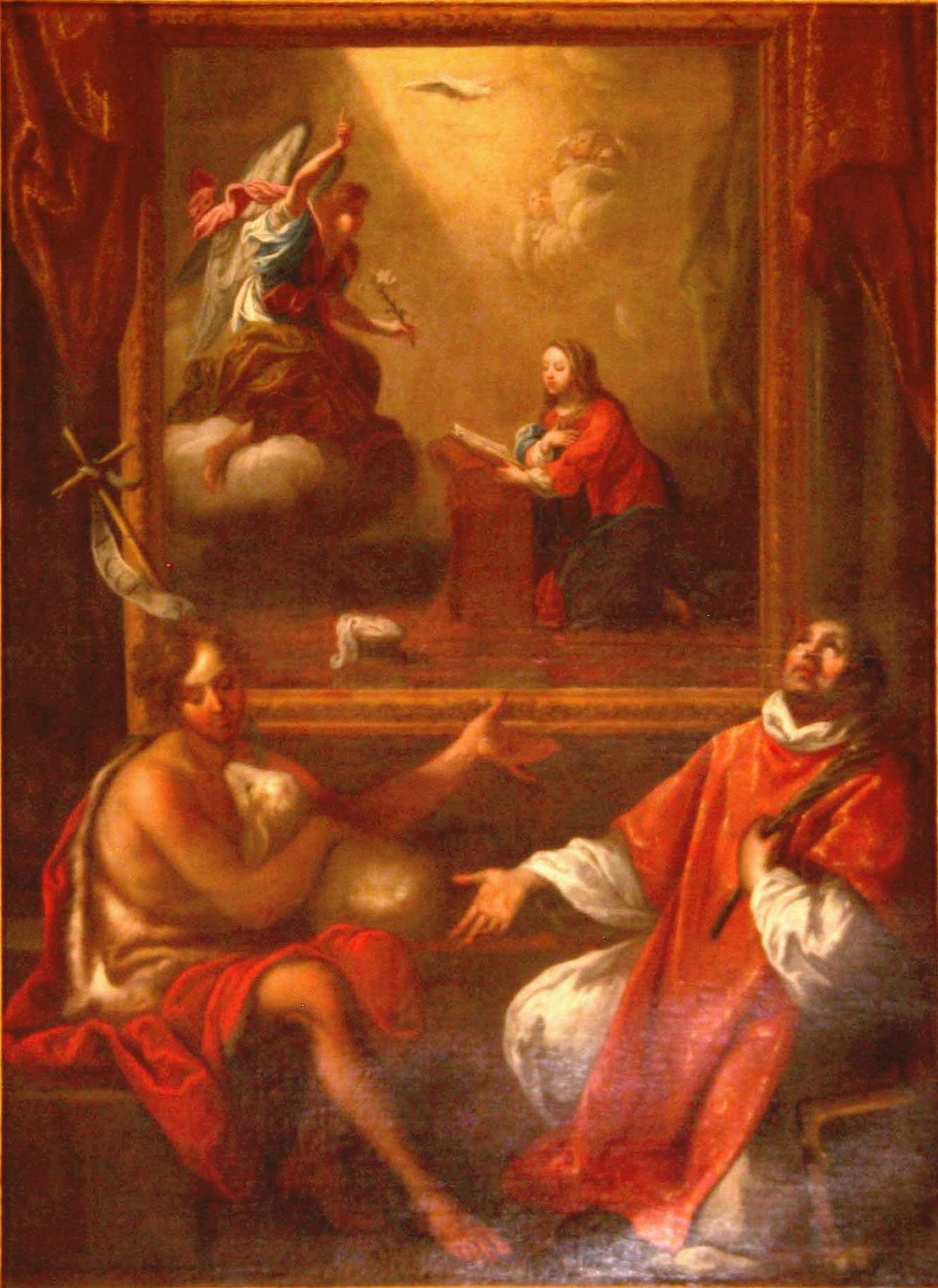
Annonciation, saint Jean-Baptiste et saint Étienne inside the Église de la Pomme in Marseille

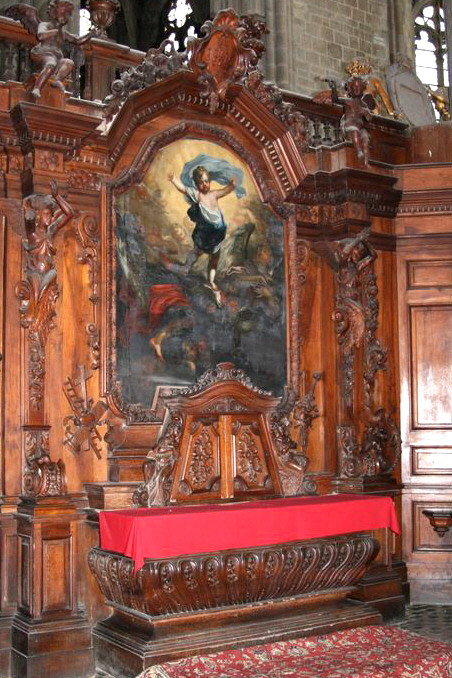
L'enfant Jésus inside the Basilica of Sainte Marie Madeleine in Saint-Maximin-la-Sainte-Baume

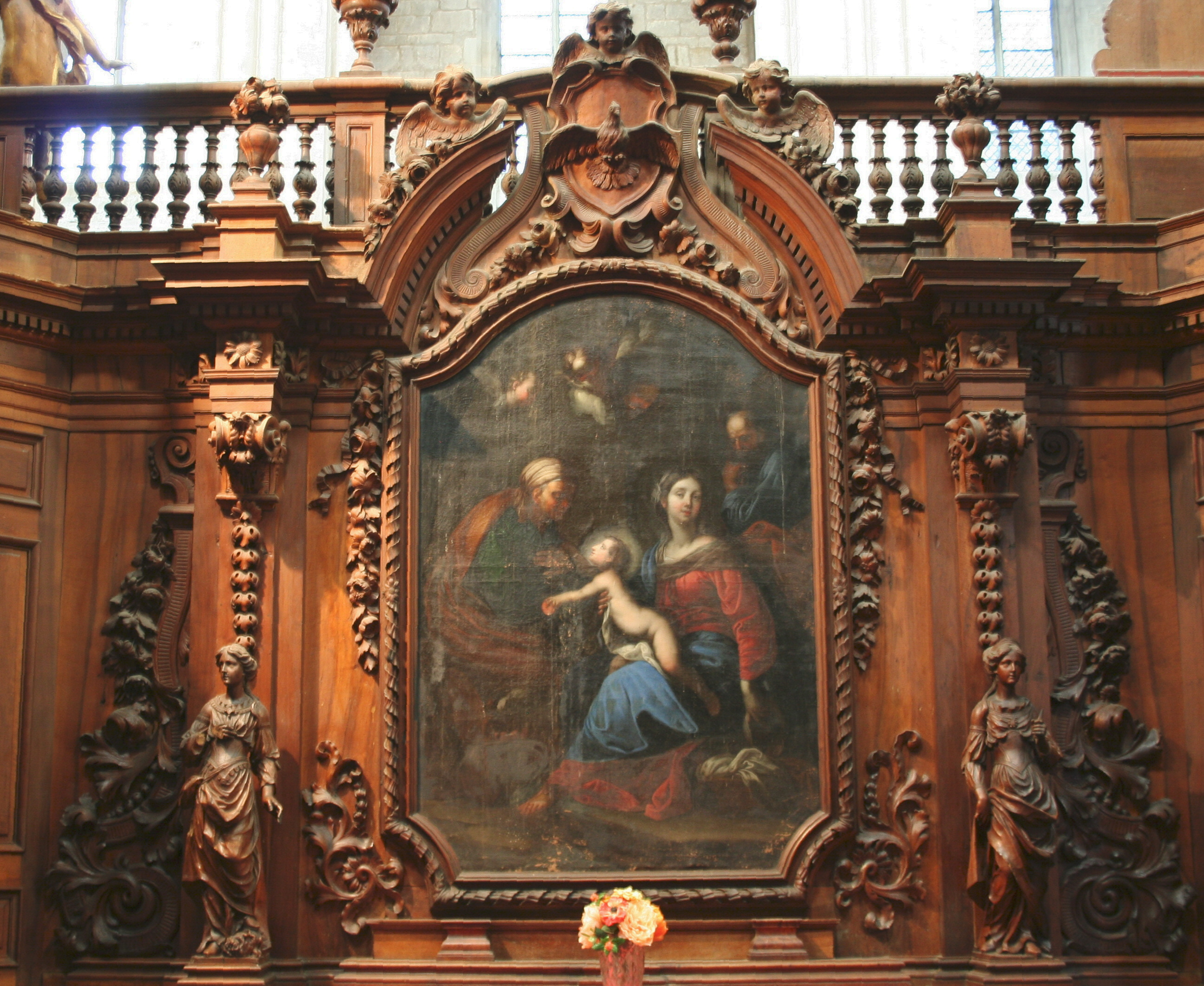
Sainte-Anne, la Vierge et l’enfant jésus, Saint-Joseph inside the Basilica of Sainte Marie Madeleine in Saint-Maximin-la-Sainte-Baume

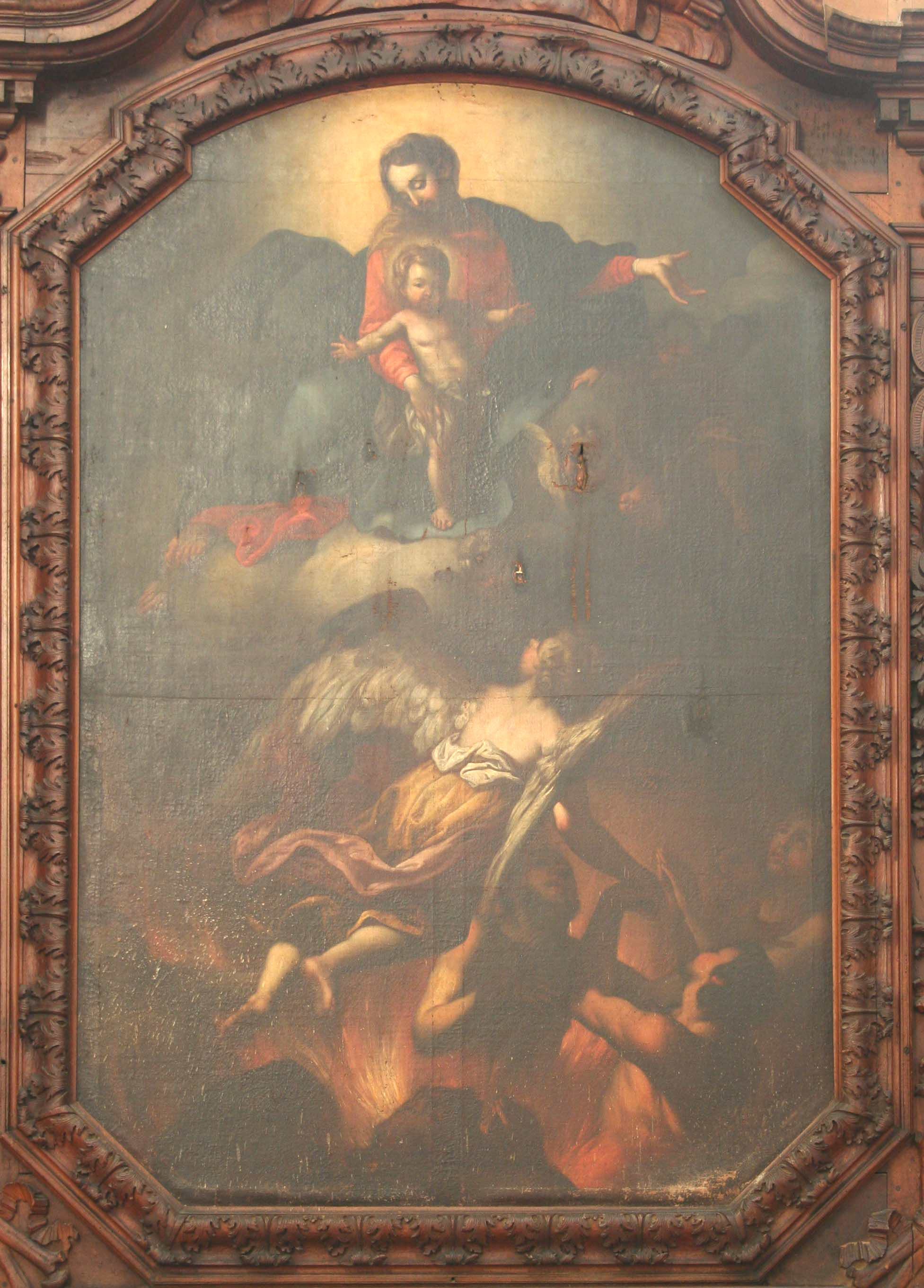
La Vierge à l'Enfant et le purgatoire inside the Basilica of Sainte Marie Madeleine in Saint-Maximin-la-Sainte-Baume

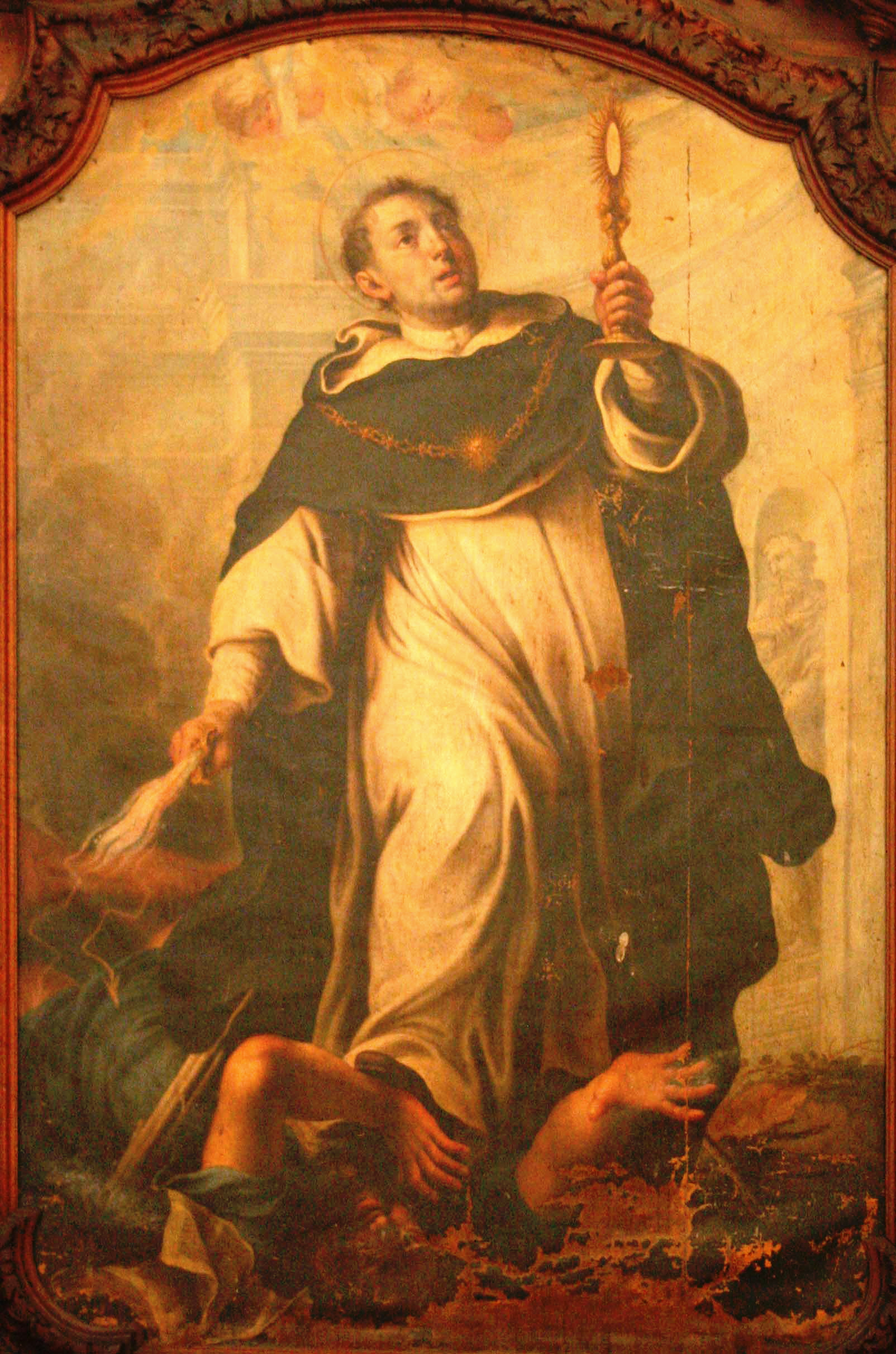
Saint-Thomas d’Aquin foudroyant l'hérésie inside the Basilica of Sainte Marie Madeleine in Saint-Maximin-la-Sainte-Baume

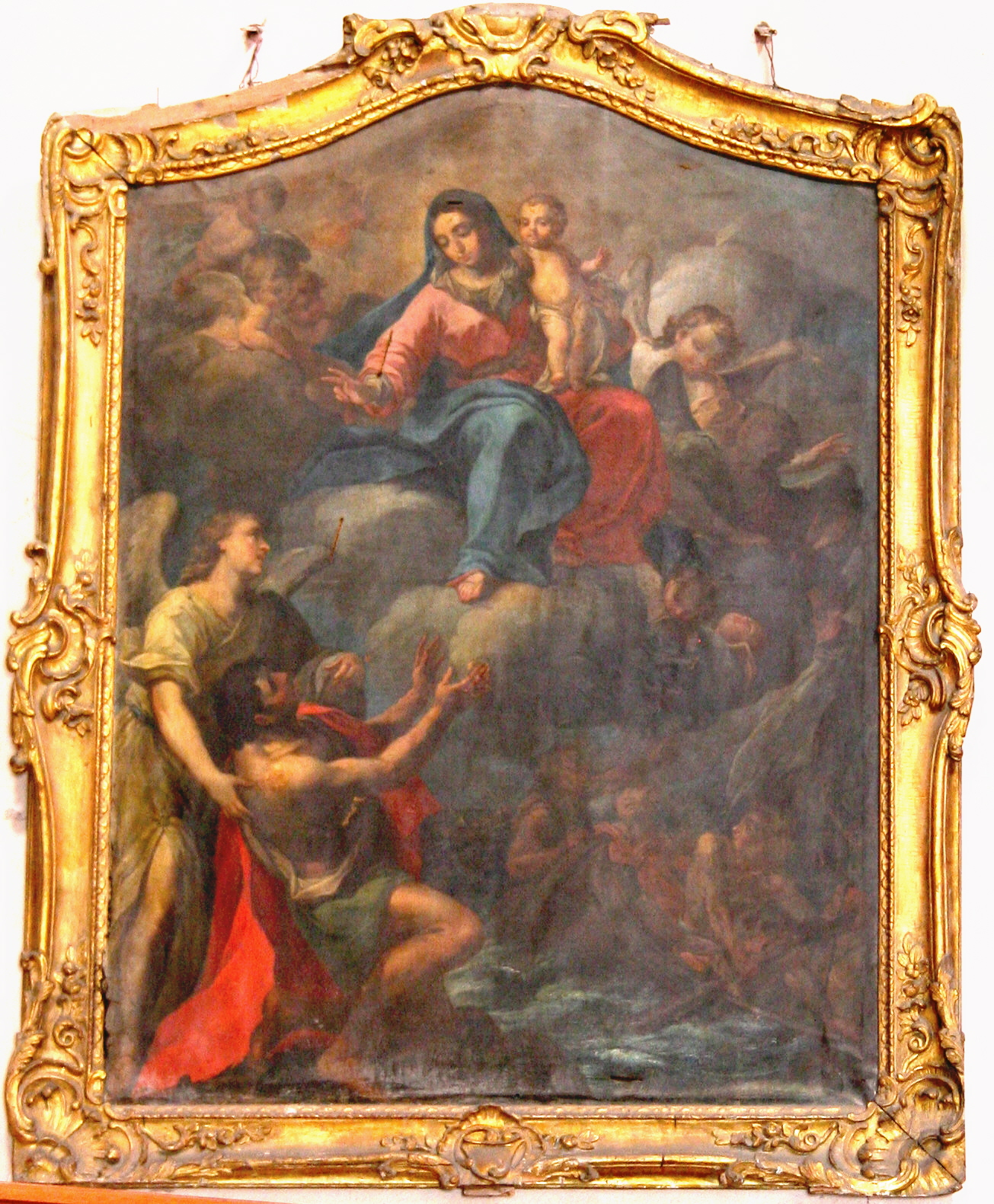
Vierge de grâces inside the Église Notre-Dame in La Ciotat

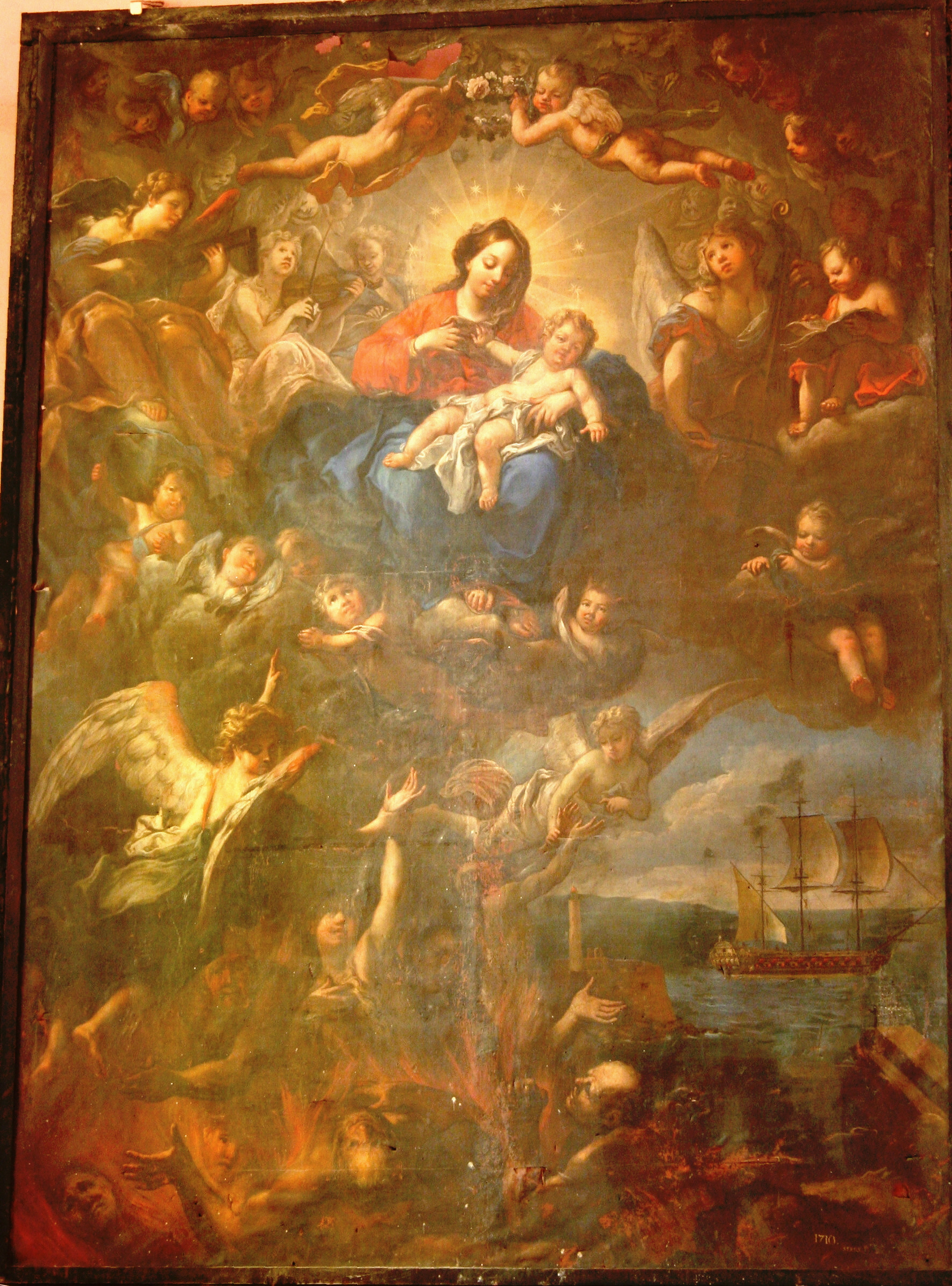
Vierge de grâces et purgatoire inside the Église Notre-Dame in La Ciotat
