= 1750s =

Decade

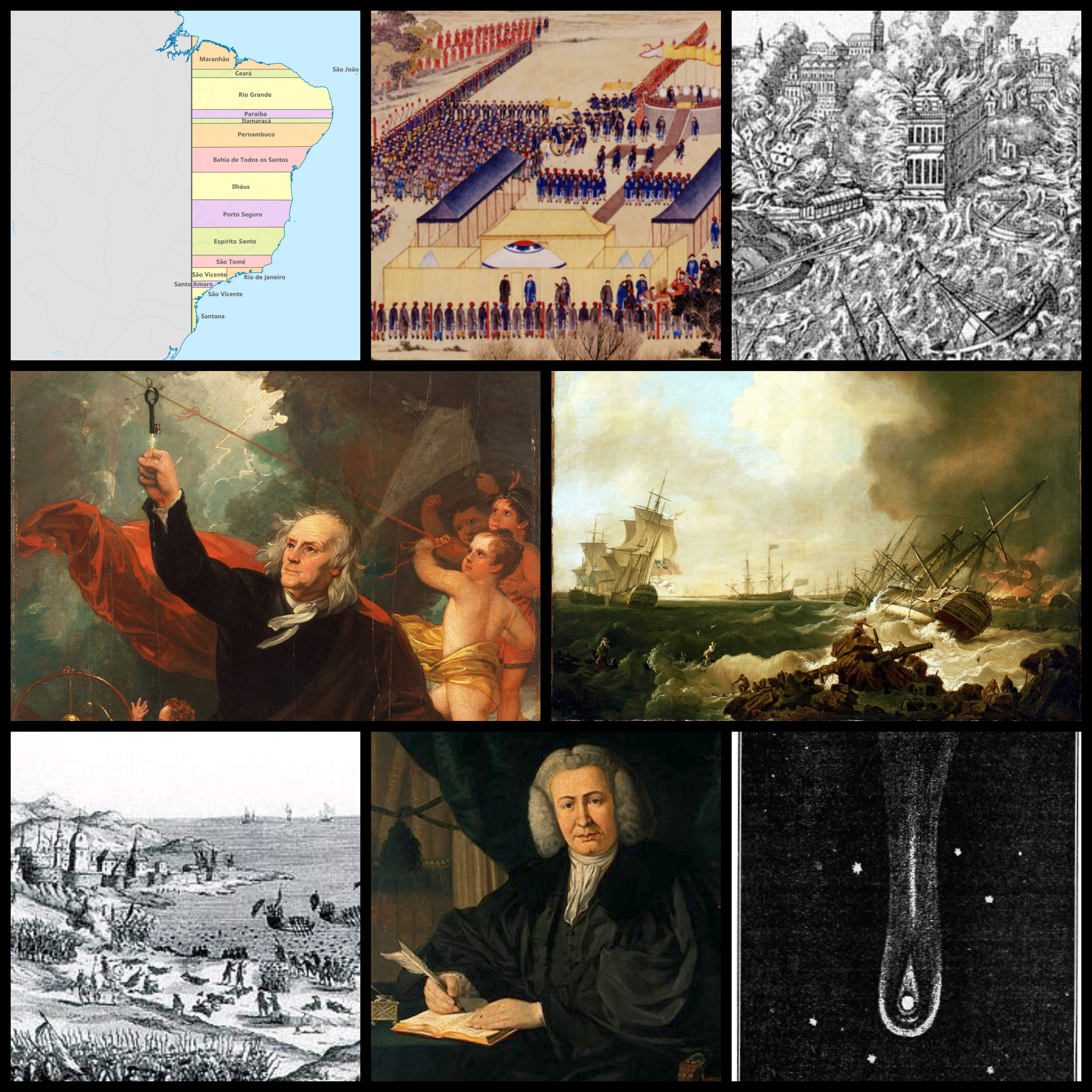
From top left, clockwise: The Treaty of Madrid amends the pre-existing Treaty of Tordesillas (1494). Signed in 1750, this Spanish-Portuguese agreement, enabled Portugal to claim more holdings in what is now Brazil; Dzungar Khanate is captured by Qing forces in 1755, ultimately transferring Xinjiang into the hands of Han Chinese power – a legacy that continues to this day in modern-day China; A destructive earthquake and tsunami ravages the city of Lisbon in 1755, strongly influencing the studies of engineering, as well as philosophical thoughts on the Western Age of Enlightenment; Britain's victory during the Battle of Quiberon Bay signalled the rise of the British Navy's power, as it heightens its ranks of becoming the world's foremost naval power, and a dominant global entity for the next two centuries; Halley's Comet appears accurately from scientific projections for the first time in 1759; Artificial refrigeration is invented and first used in 1758 under the studies of Scottish physician and chemist William Cullen; The precipitation of the French and Indian War in 1754 proved to become one of North America's first major interstate conflicts, and one of the largest to significantly involve Native American tribes such as the Iroquois, the Cherokee, and the Mi'kmaqs; Benjamin Franklin conducts his now-iconic kite experiment in 1752, demonstrating that lightning is electrical in nature and supporting the scientific foundation for his invention of lightning rods.

The 1750s (pronounced "seventeen-fifties") was a decade of the Gregorian calendar that began on January 1, 1750, and ended on December 31, 1759. The 1750s was a pioneering decade. Waves of settlers flooded the New World (specifically the Americas) in hopes of re-establishing life away from European control, and electricity was a field of novelty that had yet to be merged with the studies of chemistry and engineering. Numerous discoveries of the 1750s forged the basis for contemporary scientific consensus. The decade saw the end of the Baroque period.

== Events ==
=== 1750 ===
==== January–March ====
- January 13 – The Treaty of Madrid between Spain and Portugal authorizes a larger Brazil than had the Treaty of Tordesillas of 1494, which originally established the boundaries of the Portuguese and Spanish territories in South America.
- January 24 – A fire in Istanbul destroys 10,000 homes.
- February 15 – After Spain and Portugal agree that the Uruguay River will be the boundary line between the two kingdoms' territory in South America, the Spanish Governor orders the Jesuits to vacate seven Indian missions along the river (San Angel, San Nicolas, San Luis, San Lorenzo, San Miguel, San Juan and San Borja).
- March 5 – The Murray-Kean Company, a troupe of actors from Philadelphia, gives the first performance of a play announced in advance in a newspaper, presenting Richard III at New York City's Nassau Street Theatre.
- March 20 – The first number of Samuel Johnson's The Rambler appears.

==== April–June ====
- April 7 – Maveeran Alagumuthu Kone, a polygar in Tamil Nadu, raises slogans and launches a rebellion against Company rule in India due to his opposition to the East India Company's tax collection policies.
- April 13 – Dr. Thomas Walker and five other men (Ambrose Powell, Colby Chew, William Tomlinson, Henry Lawless and John Hughes) cross through the Cumberland Gap, a mountain pass through the Appalachian Mountains, to become the first white people to venture into territories that had been inhabited exclusively by various Native American tribes. On April 17, Walker's party continues through what is now Kentucky and locates the Cumberland River, which Walker names in honor of Prince William, Duke of Cumberland.
- April 14
  - A group of enslaved West African, bound for the Americas, successfully overpowers the crew of the British slaver ship Snow Ann, imprisons the survivors, and then navigates the vessel back to Cape Lopez in Gabon. Upon regaining their freedom, the rebels leave the survivors on the Gabonese coast.
  - The Viceroy of New Spain, Juan Francisco de Güemes, issues a notice to the missionaries in Nuevo Santander (which includes parts of what are now the U.S. state of Texas, including San Antonio, and the Mexican state of Tamaulipas) to work peacefully to convert the indigenous Karankawa people to Roman Catholicism.
- April 25 – The Acadian settlement in Beaubassin, Nova Scotia, is burnt by the French army, and the population is forcibly relocated, after France and Great Britain agree that the Missaguash River should be the new boundary between peninsular British Nova Scotia and the mainland remnant of French Acadia (now New Brunswick).
- May 16 – Two weeks after police in Paris arrest six teenagers for gambling in the suburb of Saint-Laurent, rioting breaks out when a rumor spreads that plainclothes policemen are hauling off small children between the ages of five and ten years old, in order to provide blood to an ailing aristocrat. Over the next two weeks, rioting breaks out in other sections of Paris. Police are attacked, including one who is beaten to death by the mob, until order is restored and police reforms are announced.
- June 19 – At a time when mountain climbing is still relatively uncommon, Eggert Ólafsson and Bjarni Pálsson scale their first peak, the 4,892 foot (1,491 m) high Icelandic volcano, Hekla.
- June 24 – Parliament passes Britain's Iron Act, designed to restrict American manufactured goods by prohibiting additional ironworking businesses from producing finished goods. At the same time, import taxes on raw iron from America are lifted in order to give British manufacturers additional material for production. By 1775, the North American colonies have surpassed England and Wales in iron production and have become the world's third largest producer of iron.
- June 29 – An attempt in Lima to begin a native uprising against Spanish colonial authorities in the Viceroyalty of Peru is discovered and thwarted. One of the conspirators, Francisco Garcia Jimenez, escapes to Huarochirí and kills dozens of Spaniards on July 25.

==== July–September ====
- July 9 – Traveller Jonas Hanway leaves St. Petersburg to return home, via Germany and the Netherlands. Later the same year, Hanway reputedly becomes the first Englishman to use an umbrella (a French fashion).
- July 11 – Halifax, Nova Scotia is almost completely destroyed by fire.
- July 31 – José I takes over the throne of Portugal from his deceased father, João V. King José Manuel appoints the Marquis of Pombal as his Chief Minister, who then strips the Inquisition of its power.
- August 8 – In advance of the Province of Georgia changing in status from a corporate-owned American settlement to a British colony, Royal Assent is given to an act that lifts the province's ban on slavery; effective January 1, "it shall and may be lawful to import or bring Black Slaves or Negroes in to the Province of Georgia of America and to keep and to use the same therein".
- August 20 – French astronomer Nicolas-Louis de Lacaille, by way of the Foreign Minister, the Marquis de Puisieulx and Netherlands ambassador to Paris Mattheus Lestevenon, sends a letter that ultimately persuades the States-General of the Dutch Republic to allow and partially finance Lacaille's stellar trigonometry mission to the Cape of Good Hope. The expedition departs Lorient on October 21.
- September 30 – Crispus Attucks, an enslaved African-American who will later become the first person killed in the Boston Massacre of 1770, escapes from the Framingham, Massachusetts estate of slaveowner William Brown. In an unsuccessful attempt to recapture the fugitive, Brown runs an advertisement on October 2 in the Boston Gazette, but Attucks eludes recapture.

==== October–December ====
- October 5 – Treaty of Madrid: Spain and Great Britain sign a treaty temporarily eliminating their hostility over their colonies in North and South America. In addition to both sides dropping their claims for damages against each other, Spain agrees to pay the South Sea Company £100,000 for damage claims.
- October 14 – The Louvre Museum is created in Paris four years after art critic Lafond de Saint-Yenne calls on the King to allow the display of the royal art collection to the general public. Abel-François Poisson, the Marquis de Marigny, arranges for the display of 110 of the Crown's paintings at the Palais du Luxembourg.
- November 11 – A riot breaks out in Lhasa after the murder of the regent of Tibet.
- November 18 – Westminster Bridge is officially opened in London.
- December 3 – What is described later as "The first documented presentation of a musical in New York" takes place one block east of Broadway, at the Nassau Street Theatre, when a resident company of actors stages The Beggar's Opera.
- December 25 – Prussia and Russia break off diplomatic relations after the Russians refuse to stop assisting the Electorate of Saxony. Five years later, the two Empires fight the Seven Years' War.
- December 29 – Two physicians in Jamaica, Dr. John Williams and Dr. Parker Bennet, fight a duel "with swords and pistols" after having had an argument the day before about the treatment of bilious fever. Both are mortally wounded during the fight.

==== Date unknown ====
- Hannah Snell reveals her sex to her Royal Marines compatriots.
- The King of Dahomey has income of 250,000 pounds from the overseas export of enslaved people.
- Maruyama Okyo paints The Ghost of Oyuki.
- Britain produces c. 2% of the entire world's output of industrial goods, before the Industrial Revolution begins.
- Galley slavery is abolished in Europe.
- World population: 791,000,000
  - Africa: 106,000,000
  - Asia: 502,000,000
  - Europe: 163,000,000
  - Latin-America: 16,000,000
  - Northern America: 2,000,000
  - Oceania: 2,000,000

=== 1751 ===
==== January–March ====
- January 1 – As the Province of Georgia undergoes the transition from a trustee-operated territory to a Crown colony, the prohibition against slavery is lifted by the Trustees for the Establishment of the Colony of Georgia in America. At the time, the Black population of Georgia is approximately 400 people, who had been kept in slavery in violation of the law. By 1790, the enslaved population of Georgia increases to over 29,000 and to 462,000 by 1860.
- January 7 – The University of Pennsylvania, conceived 12 years earlier by Benjamin Franklin and its other trustees to provide non-denominational higher education "to train young people for leadership in business, government and public service". rather than for the ministry, holds its first classes as "The Academy and Charitable School in the Province of Pennsylvania" in Philadelphia.
- January 13 – For the first time, the American colony in Georgia has an elected legislature after having been administered by a corporate Board of Trustees since its founding in 1732. The original Georgia Assembly meets in Savannah with 16 representatives as the colony prepares to become a British colonial province. After electing Francis Harris as the Speaker of the unicameral Assembly, the delegates successfully ask the Trustees not to surrender control of Georgia to the neighboring Province of South Carolina.
- January 18 – In the aftermath of the Lhasa riot of 1750, Chinese General Ban Di arrives at the capital of Tibet on behalf of the Qianlong Emperor and the seven imprisoned leaders of the rebellion are turned over to his custody by the 7th Dalai Lama, Keizang Gyatzo. General Ban Di guides the interrogation under torture of rebel leader Lobsang Trashi and, after five days orders the beheading and dismemberment of the seven rebels.
- February 14 – At Lakkireddipalle in southeastern India, the new Nizam of Hyderabad, Subhadar Muzaffar Jang, leads an invasion of cavalry against the small kingdom of Kurnool and is confronted by its monarch, the Nawab Bahadur Khan. The Subhadar and the Nawab order their soldiers to stand down and then engage in hand-to-hand combat, during which the Nawab "thrust[s] a spear into the Subhadar's brain" before he is "himself hacked to pieces."
- February 16 – English poet Thomas Gray first publishes Elegy Written in a Country Churchyard, anonymously in The Magazine of Magazines. The poem becomes more popularly known as "Gray's Elegy".
- February 18 – As the Governor of French Louisiana, Pierre de Rigaud, the Marquis de Vaudreuil, issues the first police regulations for New Orleans in an attempt to combat crime in that city.
- March 25 – For the last time, New Year's Day is legally on March 25, in England and Wales and "in all his Majesty's Dominions in Europe, Asia, Africa and America" due to the Calendar (New Style) Act 1750. The months of January 1751, February 1751 and most of March 1751 did not exist in British territories: those months were recorded as the last three of 1750 according to the Old Style dating system; the equivalent months a year later were recorded as the first three of 1752 under the New Style system.
- March 31 – Frederick, Prince of Wales, heir-apparent to the British throne, dies of a pulmonary embolism at the age of 44 after a game of cricket. His 12-year-old son, Prince George, becomes the heir-apparent and will later become King George III. Frederick's widow Augusta of Saxe-Gotha becomes Dowager Princess of Wales.

==== April–June ====
- April 5 – Sweden's King Frederick I dies at the age of 74 (March 25 on the Julian calendar, which remains in effect in Sweden and Finland until 1753), after a reign of 31 years, bringing an end to the rule of Sweden by the House of Hesse because he has no legitimate heirs. Prince Adolf Frederick of the House of Holstein-Gottorp, who had been elected as the crown prince in 1743, becomes the new King.
- April 19 – The Qianlong Emperor of China visits the southern capital of Nanjing for the first time, bringing with him 3,000 staff and 6,690 horses and stays for four days.
- April 20 – A month after the death of his father, 12-year old Prince George William Frederick is formally invested as the new Prince of Wales. Nine years later, Prince George becomes King George III upon the death of his grandfather, King George II.
- April 29 – The sport of cricket is first played in the American colonies, as a team of New Yorkers plays against a team of Englishmen and defeats them, 167 to 80, in a match in Greenwich Village.
- May 11 – The Pennsylvania Hospital, first hospital in the American colonies, is chartered in Philadelphia by the Pennsylvania legislature, which grants the right to Benjamin Franklin and to Dr. Thomas Bond.
- May 27 (May 13 Old Style) – Adoption of the Gregorian calendar: Royal assent is given to An Act for Regulating the Commencement of the Year; and for Correcting the Calendar now in Use (the "Calendar Act") passed by the Parliament of Great Britain, introducing the Gregorian Calendar, correcting the eleven-day difference between Old Style and New Style dates and making 1 January legally New Year's Day from 1752 in the British Empire. It is largely promoted by George Parker, 2nd Earl of Macclesfield.
- June 14 – The colony of South Carolina reverses a 10-year-old law that had imposed a tax of 100 pounds sterling on the purchase of imported African slaves, and reduces the tax to £10. The move effectively restores the slave trade to the colony.
- June 28 – The first volume of Denis Diderot's Encyclopédie, ou dictionnaire raisonné des sciences, des arts et des métiers, often referred to as le Encyclopédie, is published

==== July–September ====
- July 28 – Battle of Kirkhbulakh: The Kingdom of Kartli defeats a large army of the Tabriz Khanate, under Erekle II.
- July 31 – Fire destroys 1,000 houses in Stockholm.
- August 13 – The Academy and College of Philadelphia, predecessor to the private University of Pennsylvania, opens its doors, with Benjamin Franklin as president.
- September 13 – Kalvária Banská Štiavnica in the Kingdom of Hungary is completed.

==== October–December ====
- October 22 – William V, Prince of Orange, the three-year-old son of the late William IV, becomes the last Stadtholder of the Dutch Republic. During his minority, his mother, Princess Anne, acts as regent until her death in 1759. Upon becoming of age in 1766, he will have a corrupt reign as the Republic's head of state until the office is abolished on February 23, 1785.
- October 27 – The Hōreki period begins in Japan.
- November 14 – The 50-day long siege of the British fort of Trichinopoly (now Tiruchirappalli) in southern India is broken when the defenders use musket fire to force a stampede of the elephants of the French-backed troops of Chanda Sahib.
- November 17
  - Future United States President George Washington becomes seriously ill with smallpox while he and his older brother Lawrence are visiting the island of Barbados during an epidemic Washington, 19 years old, survives the virus but is bedridden for almost a month.
  - The Pima Revolt begins in the area that now includes the Mexican state of Sonora and the U.S. state of Arizona, as Pima Indian leader Luis Oacpicagigua carries out the massacre of 18 Spanish settlers at Oacpicagigua's home in Sáric. The rebellion, which takes the lives of more than 100 Spaniards, is ended on March 18 after Governor Diego Ortiz Parilla permits the rebels to surrender for imprisonment.
- November 26 – Adolf Frederick is formally crowned as the King of Sweden. The coronation ceremony takes place almost eight months after he assumed the throne.
- November 29 – The Cherokee nation signs a treaty with British colonial authorities at the close of the two-week Charlestown Conference in Charleston, South Carolina, with Governor James Glen signing an agreement with Cherokee war chiefs led by the "Old Skiagunsta" of Keowee, the Raven of Hiwasee, Old Caesar of Chatuga and Kittagusta of Joree.
- December 3 – Battle of Arnee in India (Second Carnatic War): A British East India Company–led force under Robert Clive defeats and routs a much larger Franco-Indian army, under the command of Raza Sahib, at Arni.
- December 14 – The Theresian Military Academy is founded in Wiener Neustadt, Austria.

==== Date unknown ====
- Zand Iran is established by Karim Khan Zand.
- In the University of Glasgow (Scotland):
  - Adam Smith is appointed professor of logic.
  - The Medical School is founded.
- Ferdinando Galiani publishes the first modern economic analysis, Della Moneta.
- Swedish naturalist Carl Linnaeus publishes his Philosophia Botanica, the first textbook of descriptive systematic botanical taxonomy, and the first appearance of his binomial nomenclature.
- 1751–1775 – 13 per cent of appointees to audiencias in the Spanish Empire are Creoles.

=== 1752 ===
==== January–March ====
- January 1 – The British Empire (except Scotland, which had changed New Year's Day to January 1 in 1600) adopts today as the first day of the year as part of adoption of the Gregorian calendar, which is completed in September: today is the first day of the New Year under the terms of last year's Calendar Act of the British Parliament.
- February 10 – Pennsylvania Hospital, the first hospital in the United States, and the first to offer medical treatment to the mentally ill, admits its first patients at a temporary location in Philadelphia.
- February 23 – Messier 83 (M83), the "Southern Pinwheel Galaxy" and the first to be cataloged outside the "Local Group" of galaxies nearest to Earth's galaxy, the Milky Way, is discovered by French astronomer Nicolas-Louis de Lacaille. Lacaille, who observes M83 during a research voyage in the Southern Hemisphere, is the first to identify the body as a nebulous object rather than a star. M83, 15 million light-years away, is the most distant object to be identified up to that time.
- February 27 – The Virginia Assembly passes a law making maiming a felony, in response to the practice of gouging.
- February 29 – Alaungpaya, a village chief in Upper Burma, founds the Konbaung Dynasty; by the time of his death 8 years later, he will have unified the whole country.
- March 14 – Shō Kei, the ruler of Okinawa Island and the Ryukyu Kingdom, dies at the age of 41 after a reign that began when he was 13 years old. He is succeeded by his 12-year-old son, Shō Boku, who reigns for 42 years.
- March 18 – The electors of the Republic of Venice (which includes not only a large part of northern Italy around the city of Venice, but portions of Eastern Europe along the Adriatic Sea) elect Francesco Loredan as their new executive, the Doge. Loredan's election comes 11 days after the death of the previous Doge, Pietro Grimani, but is not announced until after Easter Sunday.
- March 23
  - The Halifax Gazette, the first Canadian newspaper, is published.
  - Ava, capital of the Kingdom of Burma, is sacked by Hanthawaddy Kingdom, led by King Binnya Dala.

==== April–June ====
- April 6 – Spanish Governor Tomás Vélez Cachupín of Santa Fe de Nuevo México, a province that now comprises most of the American state of New Mexico, begins the first peace negotiations with the indigenous Comanche tribe after inviting tribal representatives to his home in Taos. As a sign of good faith, he unconditionally releases the four Comanche prisoners of war held at Taos. One of the released Comanches reports to his father, Chief Guanacante, about the hospitality extended to him during his imprisonment, and more meetings take place in July and in the autumn.
- April 12
  - The Kingdom of Afghanistan, under the rule of Ahmad Shah Durrani, recaptures the city of Lahore four years after its capture by the Sikhs of Punjab.
  - The Real Academia de Bellas Artes de San Fernando, Spain's Royal Academy of the Fine Arts, is formally established in Spain, eight years after first being proposed to King Fernando VI by Jeronimo Antonio Gil as a small school in Madrid. The foundation of the Royal Academy is considered by historians to be "an essential step in modernizing Spain" during the Spanish Enlightenment.
- April 13 – The oldest property insurance company in the United States, "Philadelphia Contributionship for the Insurance of Houses from Loss by Fire", holds its organizational meeting at the courthouse in Philadelphia to elect a board of directors, largely through the efforts of Benjamin Franklin. Franklin's newspaper, The Pennsylvania Gazette, has been advertising the meeting since February 18, with a notice that "All persons inclined to subscribe to the articles of insurance of houses from fire, in or near this city, are desired to appear at the Court-house, where attendance will be given, to take in their subscriptions, every seventh day of the week, in the afternoon, until the 13th of April next, being the day appointed by the said articles for electing twelve directors and a treasurer." The property insurance company is still in existence more than 250 years later.
- April 22 – Adam Smith, appointed the year before as a professor of logic, is unanimously elected by the faculty of the University of Glasgow to be the new Professor of Moral Philosophy "on the express condition that he would content himself with the emoluments of the Logic Professorship until 10 October", in that the 1751-1752 salary budgeted for the job has already been distributed to faculty members who had substituted for the previous moral philosophy professor, Thomas Craigie; from April to October, Smith's remuneration for teaching moral philosophy is limited to fees paid directly to him by his students (a half guinea per semester for the public class, and a guinea per semester for the private class). Smith's lectures on ethics are first published in 1759 in his work The Theory of Moral Sentiments.
- May 10 – At Marly-la-Ville in France, physicist Thomas-François Dalibard successfully conducts the kite experiment proposed by Benjamin Franklin in the 1750 book Franklin's Experiments and Observations on Electricity.
- June – Benjamin Franklin reportedly carries out his famous kite experiment, duplicating experiments that show that lightning and electricity are the same. According to Franklin, lightning strikes the kite that he is flying during a thunderstorm and produces sparks identical to what he has previously generated artificially in a Leyden jar. However, the report of his experiment is not made until October 19, in Franklin's newspaper, The Pennsylvania Gazette, leading 20th century researchers to doubt that he conducted the experiment, if at all, until sometime after September 28, when he had written in the Gazette about other such experiments, and that he was making a claim that he had conceived the experiment independently.
- June 3 – A fire destroys 13,000 houses in Moscow in the Russian Empire, only 11 days after a May 23 fire destroyed 5,000 homes; by June 6, two-thirds of the city has been damaged or destroyed.
- June 13 – The Treaty of Logstown is signed by representatives of the Iroquois Confederation, Lenape and Shawnee leaders, and commissioners from Virginia, headed by Joshua Fry. Christopher Gist and William Trent represent the Ohio Company. The treaty grants control over lands south and east of the Ohio River to the English, along with permission to build a fort on the site of what is now Pittsburgh.
- June 21 – Pickawillany (now Piqua, Ohio), the capital of the Miami Indian nation, is attacked and burned by Odawa, Ojibwe and French soldiers under the command of Odawa War Chief Charles Michel de Langlade.

==== July–September ====
- July 1 – In Istanbul, Divitdar Mehmed Emin Pasha is dismissed from his position as Grand Vizier of the Ottoman Empire by the Ottoman Sultan, Mahmud I. The Sultan appoints Çorlulu Ali Pasha as the new Grand Vizier.
- July 30 – The first of the Kronstadt canals, conceived by Peter the Great and designed to link two of the harbors of the Russian city, is completed and opened to maritime traffic.
- August 3 – Edward Cornwallis, the British Governor of Nova Scotia, is recalled to Britain after being unsuccessful in pressuring Nova Scotia's Acadian population to take an oath of allegiance to the Crown or to face expulsion. His replacement, Peregrine Hopson, is more lenient with the Acadians but is reassigned less than two years later.
- August 21 – A group of Scottish Presbyterians who had fled to America from Scotland held the first Covenanter communion in the 13 American colonies, meeting in New Kingstown, Pennsylvania.
- August 25 – The first group of the United Brethren church, commonly called the Moravians, leaves Bethlehem, Pennsylvania on a mission to find 100,000 acres (40,000 ha) of land on which to build "Villages of the Lord" for German emigres to settle upon in America; after a 450-mile (720 km) journey, they arrive in Edenton, North Carolina on September 10 and eventually purchase the Wachovia Tract, a set of lands in the western North Carolina colony.
- September 2 of Julian calendar (Wednesday) (September 13 "New Style") – Great Britain and the British Empire use the Julian calendar for the last time and adopt the Gregorian calendar, making the next day Thursday, September 14 in the English-speaking world. A newspaper at the time notes the next day that "Altho' we have more than once, for the Information of our Readers, publish'd some Accounts of the Alteration of the Style, which took Place this Day, agreeable to a late Act of Parliament, in all his Majesty's Dominions in Europe, Asia, Africa and America" and notes that "The Supputation of the Year began on the first Day of January last, and for the future the first Day of that Month will be stiled the first Day of every Year in all Accounts whatsoever, which Supputation or Reckoning never took Place before this Year in any Courts of Law until the 25th Day of March", and adds, "This Day, had not this Act passed, would have been the 3rd of September, but is now reckoned the 14th, eleven nominal Days being omitted."

==== October–December ====
- October 19 — In his Philadelphia newspaper, the Pennsylvania Gazette, Benjamin Franklin first describes the performance in Philadelphia of the kite experiment that he had proposed in his 1750 book. Although the original account makes no claim that he was the first to do the experiment (which had been done by other scientists (including Thomas-François Dalibard in May), nor that he conducted the test, and it does not give a date for the experiment, it becomes embellished as the story that Franklin "discovered electricity"; in 1766, the story first circulates that Franklin flew the kite in June 1752, without specifying a date (as Franklin had done in other scientific accounts).
- November 3 – A hurricane destroys the Spanish settlement on Florida's Santa Rosa Island, leaving only two buildings standing; the remaining residents decide to move from the barrier island on the Gulf of Mexico and to start a settlement on the nearby mainland and construct the Presidio San Miguel de Panzacola, which later forms the nucleus of the city of Pensacola, Florida.
- November 8 – British Governor Hopson of Nova Scotia and French Governor General of New France, the Marquis Duquesne, agree to a free exchange of deserters from each other's armies in Canada, with the understanding that neither side will execute a deserter once returned.
- November 22 – "Father Le Loutre's War", the war between the British Canadian colonists of Nova Scotia and the indigenous Mi'kmaq (Micmac) tribe halts temporarily when a peace treaty is signed between the warring parties at Shubenacadie, Nova Scotia. Governor Hopson, accompanied by former Governor Cornwallis, signs on behalf of the British and Chief Kopit (Jean-Baptiste Cope), the Sakamaw of the Mi'kmaq, signs on behalf of his people.
- December 5 – The first presentation of a Shakespearean play in America is performed when a company of players stages The Merchant of Venice in Williamsburg, Virginia.

=== 1753 ===
==== January–March ====
- January 3 – King Binnya Dala of the Hanthawaddy Kingdom orders the burning of Ava, the former capital of the Kingdom of Burma.
- January 29 – After a month's absence, Elizabeth Canning returns to her mother's home in London and claims that she was abducted; the following criminal trial causes an uproar.
- February 17 – The concept of electrical telegraphy is first published in the form of a letter to Scots' Magazine from a writer who identifies himself only as "C.M.". Titled "An Expeditious Method of Conveying Intelligence", C.M. suggests that static electricity (generated by 1753 from "frictional machines") could send electric signals across wires to a receiver. Rather than the dot and dash system later used by Samuel F.B. Morse, C.M. proposes that "a set of wires equal in number to the letters of the alphabet, be extended horizontally between two given places" and that on the receiving side, "Let a ball be suspended from every wire" and that a paper with a letter on it be underneath each wire.
- March 1 – Sweden adopts the Gregorian calendar, by skipping the 11 days difference between it and the Julian calendar, and letting February 17 be followed directly by March 1.

==== April–June ====
- April 16 – The Jewish Naturalisation Act 1753 is passed by Britain's House of Lords, permitting Jewish immigrants to England to become naturalized citizens "without receiving the Sacrament of the Lord's Supper". The bill, introduced by George Montagu-Dunk, 2nd Earl of Halifax, passes the House of Commons on May 22.
- May 1 – Species Plantarum is published by Linnaeus (adopted by the International Code of Botanical Nomenclature as the formal start date of the scientific classification of plants).
- May 22 – The Jewish Naturalisation Act 1753 passes the House of Commons and later receives royal assent from King George II.
- June 6 – The Parliament of Great Britain passes Lord Hardwicke's Marriage Act "for the Better Preventing of Clandestine Marriage" in England and Wales. King George II adjourns Parliament the next day; the act comes into effect on March 25, 1754.
- June 7 – The British Museum is established in London, by Act of Parliament.

==== July–September ====
- July 7 – The Parliament of Great Britain's Jewish Naturalization Act receives royal assent, allowing naturalization to Jews; it is repealed in 1754.

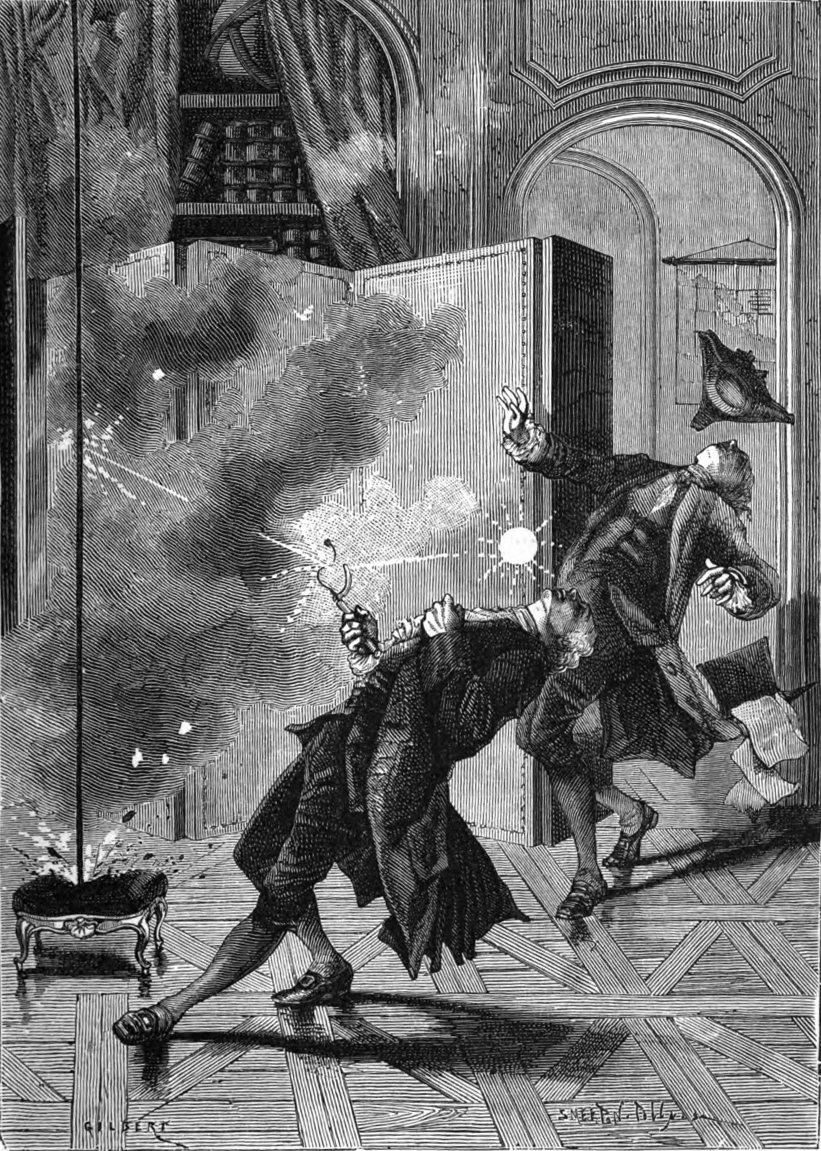
Richmann's electrocution

- August 6 – Russian scientist Georg Richmann becomes the first person to be electrocuted by his own equipment after he uses an insulated, but improperly grounded, lightning rod in an attempt to gather data on a thunderstorm. Richmann also becomes the first victim of ball lightning during his scientific experiment, in an attempt to replicate the experiments of American Benjamin Franklin.
- August 7 – The Unity of Brethren, a branch of the Moravian Church, receives a grant the Wachovia Tract, 99,985 acres (404.62 km^{2}) of land (approximately 157 square miles), in western North Carolina, for the benefit of German-speaking immigrants to America. The area now includes Winston-Salem, North Carolina.
- August 21 – After receiving a series of warnings about incursions into land claimed by the Crown Colony of Virginia (from the colony's Lieutenant Governor, Robert Dinwiddie), the cabinet of British Prime Minister Henry Pelham votes to send a warning to Britain's colonial governors "to prevent, by Force, These and any such attempts" to encroach on their lands "that may be made by the French, or by the Indians in the French interest." Britain's Secretary of State for the Southern Department, the Earl of Holderness, sends the circular order on August 28.
- September 3 – Tanacharison, a chief of the Oneida people tribe that is one of the "Six Nations" of the Iroquois Confederacy, meets with French officers who have come into the Ohio and Allegheny region and warns them not to advance further into the Iroquois territory.
- September 18 – Britain's Board of Trade sends a directive to the colonial and provincial governors of Maryland, Massachusetts, New Hampshire, New Jersey, New York, and Pennsylvania ordering them to send delegates to a summit meeting with the Iroquois Confederacy. The message instructs the governors that King George II has ordered "a Sum of Money to be issued for Presents to the Six Nations of Indians" and ordering New York's Governor George Clinton "to hold an Interview with them for delivering these Presents, for burying the Hatchet, and for renewing the Covenant Chain with them."

==== October–December ====
- October 31 – Virginia Lieutenant Governor Dinwiddie commissions 21-year-old militia Major George Washington to dissuade the French from occupying the Ohio Country.
- November 12 – Spain's King Fernando VI issues a set of 25 regulations and restrictions for theatrical performances, including a requirement that the directors of the acting troupes "take the greatest care that the necessary modesty is preserved" and that the actors should be reminded that chastity requires that "indecent and provocative" dances should be avoided.
- November 12 – A fire destroys the Emperor's Palace in Moscow.
- November 24 – José Alfonso Pizarro completes more than four years as the Spanish Viceroy of New Granada (which comprises modern-day Colombia, Venezuela and Ecuador) and is succeeded by José Solís Folch de Cardona.
- November 25 – The Russian Academy of Sciences announces a competition among chemists and physicists to provide "the best explanation of the true causes of electricity including their theory", with a deadline of June 1, 1755 (on the Julian calendar used in Russia, June 12 on the Gregorian calendar used in Western Europe and the New World).
- December 11 – Major George Washington and British guide Christopher Gist arrive at Fort Le Boeuf (near modern-day Waterford, Pennsylvania and the city of Erie), a French fortress built in territory claimed by the British Crown Colony of Virginia. Washington presents the fort's commander, French Army Captain Jacques Legardeur de Saint-Pierre, a message from Virginia's Lieutenant Governor Dinwiddie advising that "The lands upon the Ohio River are so notoriously known to be the property of the Crown of Great Britain that it is a matter of equal concern and surprise... to hear that a body of French fortresses and making settlements upon that river, within His Majesty's dominions," adding that "It becomes my duty to require your peaceable departure." Captain Legardeur provides a reply for Washington to take to Dinwiddie, declaring that the rights of France's King Louis XV to the land "are incontestable", and refuses to back down, leading to beginning of the French and Indian War in 1754.

==== Date unknown ====
- James Lind writes A Treatise of the Scurvy.
- Robert Wood publishes The ruins of Palmyra; otherwise Tedmor in the desart in English and French, making the ancient Syrian city of Palmyra known to the West.
- The Cramer family starts a brewing operation at Warstein in North Rhine-Westphalia, originating the Warsteiner brand.

=== 1754 ===
==== January–March ====
- January 28 – Horace Walpole, in a letter to Horace Mann, coins the word serendipity.
- February 22 – Expecting an attack by Portuguese-speaking militias in the Viceroyalty of the Río de la Plata, the indigenous Guarani people residing in the Misiones Orientales stage an attack on a small Brazilian Portuguese settlement on the Rio Pardo in what is now the Brazilian state of Rio Grande do Sul. The attack by 300 Guarani soldiers from the missions at San Luis, San Lorenzo and San Juan Bautista is repelled with a loss of 30 Guarani and is the opening of the Guarani War
- February 25 – Guatemalan Sergeant Major Melchor de Mencos y Varón departs the city of Santiago de los Caballeros de Guatemala with an infantry battalion to fight British pirates that are reportedly disembarking on the coasts of Petén (modern-day Belize), and sacking the nearby towns.
- March 16 – Ten days after the death of British Prime Minister Henry Pelham, his brother Thomas Pelham-Holles, 1st Duke of Newcastle, forms a government as the new Prime Minister of Great Britain.
- March 25 – The Clandestine Marriages Act 1753 comes into force in England and Wales, placing marriage in that jurisdiction on a statutory basis for the first time.

==== April–June ====
- April 30 – Battle of San Felipe and the Cobá Lagoon: Guatemalan Sergeant Mayor Melchor de Mencos y Varón and his troops defeat the British pirates.
- May 14 – The Royal and Ancient Golf Club of St Andrews is founded in Scotland.
- May 28 – French and Indian War: Battle of Jumonville Glen – The war begins when George Washington, 22, leads a company of militia from the Colony of Virginia, in an ambush on a force of 35 French Canadians.
- June 19 – The Albany Congress of seven northern colonies proposes an American Union.

==== July–September ====
- July 3 – French and Indian War – Battle of Fort Necessity: George Washington surrenders Fort Necessity to French Capt. Louis Coulon de Villiers, the only surrender in Washington's military career.
- July 10 – The Albany Plan of Union is given official approval by the delegates from New York, Pennsylvania, Maryland, Rhode Island, New Hampshire and Massachusetts, with Connecticut opposing. The plan approved at the meeting in Albany, New York is based on Benjamin Franklin's suggestions of "a general union of the British colonies on the continent" for a common defense policy. As amended at the assembly, the proposed union calls for the British Parliament to approve the arrangement, which would encompass all of the British North American colonies except for Georgia and Nova Scotia. The plan, to be considered by the individual colonies for ratification, provides for an inter-colonial legislature (the Grand Council) composed of between two and seven representatives for each colony, depending on population. It also provides for a "President General" who can veto Grand Council legislation, a common defense budget with colonies contributing proportionately to their representation, and an inter-colonial army whose officers would be selected by the Grand Council.
- July 17 – Classes begin at Columbia University, founded on October 31 as King's College by royal charter of King George II of Great Britain. The college is originally located in Lower Manhattan in the Province of New York. Instruction is suspended in 1776, and the school reopens in 1784 as Columbia College. With the college's growth in the 19th century, it is renamed Columbia University in 1896.
- August 6 – The British North American Province of Georgia is created. Originally established in 1732 as a place for impoverished English citizens and debt prison parolees to make a new life, is given its first royal government. Administered for 22 years by the Board of Trustees for the Establishment of the Colony of Georgia in America, chaired by philanthropist James Oglethorpe, the colony is transferred by the Trustees to the British crown's Board of Trade and Plantations. King George II, for whom the colony was named, follows the Board's recommendation by proclaiming Georgia a royal province, and appointing Royal Navy Captain John Reynolds as the first Royal Governor. Reynolds arrives in Savannah on October 29 to take office.
- August 17 – Pennsylvania becomes the first of the British colonies to address Benjamin Franklin's Albany Plan for an inter-colonial union. With Franklin absent from Philadelphia, Pennsylvania's House of Representatives votes against to not consider the Plan at all, and to not refer it to the next legislative session for debate.
- August 19 – Lieutenant Colonel George Washington is forced to confront his first mutiny as 25 members of his Virginia militia refuse to obey orders from their officers. Washington, who is attending church services at the time, quickly suppresses the rebellion and the mutineers are imprisoned before more join.
- August 30 – New Hampshire settlers Susannah Willard Johnson and her family are taken hostage by the Abenaki Indians during an attack near Charlestown. Nine months pregnant at the time of their capture, Johnson gives birth two days later to a child, whom she names Elizabeth Captive Johnson. For the next two years, the family is held for ransom in Canada before she is released. In 1796, she will recount the story in a popular memoir, A Narrative of the Captivity of Mrs. Johnson.
- September 2 – A powerful earthquake strikes Constantinople shortly after 9 o'clock in the evening. A Scottish physician, Mordach Mackenzie, reports in a letter that the tremor damaged or destroyed numerous buildings and comments, "Some say there were 2000 people destroyed by this calamity, in the town and suburbs; some 900; and others reduce them to 60, who, by what I have seen, are nearer the truth."
- September 11 – Anthony Henday, an English explorer, becomes the first white man to reach the Canadian Rockies, after climbing a ridge above the Red Deer River near what is now Innisfail, Alberta.

==== October–December ====
- October 24 – China's Qianlong Emperor reverses a longstanding policy that barred Chinese subjects from ever returning to China if they remained out of the country for more than three years.
- October 31 – What will become Columbia University is chartered as "a College in the Province of New York... in the City of New York in America... named King's College", with the charter submitted by New York's colonial governor, James De Lancey.
- November 28 – Denmark establishes the Renteskirverkontor, an office within the Chamber of Finance, to oversee the colonial affairs of the Danish West Indies (Dansk Vestindien). Peder Mariager, who had been a minor official of the Danish West Indies Company, becomes the first administrator. The colony, consisting of the islands of Saint Thomas, Saint John and Saint Croix later is purchased by the United States from Denmark and is now the U.S. Virgin Islands.
- November 29 – Karim Khan Zand, the King of Persia (now Iran) recaptures the city of Shiraz from Afghan warlord Azad Khan Afghan, who had taken control of much of central Iran since 1749.
- December 13 – Osman III succeeds his brother Mahmud I as Ottoman Emperor; he will rule until his death in 1757.
- December 26 – Massachusetts becomes the third colony (after Pennsylvania and Connecticut) to reject the Albany Plan for an inter-colonial union, voting 48 to 31 to postpone consideration of the union question indefinitely.

==== Date unknown ====
- Surveyor William Churton lays out what will become the seat of Orange County, North Carolina. The town is named Corbin Town for Francis Corbin, a member of the North Carolina governor's council. Corbin Town is renamed Childsburgh in 1759, and finally Hillsborough in 1766.
- St. Florian's Martyr Greek Catholic Church, Budapest is built.
- Marian apparition at Las Lajas in Colombia.

=== 1755 ===
==== January–March ====
- January 23 (O. S. January 12, Tatiana Day, nowadays celebrated on January 25) – Moscow University is established.
- February 13 – Treaty of Giyanti: The kingdom of Mataram on Java is divided in two, creating the sultanate of Yogyakarta and the sunanate of Surakarta.
- March 12 – A steam engine is used in the American colonies for the first time as New Jersey copper mine owner Arent Schuyler installs a Newcomen atmospheric engine to pump water out of a mineshaft.
- March 22 – Britain's House of Commons votes in favor of £1,000,000 of appropriations to expand the British Army and Royal Navy operations in North America.
- March 26 – General Edward Braddock and 1,600 British sailors and soldiers arrive at Alexandria, Virginia on transport ships that have sailed up the Potomac River. Braddock, sent to take command of the British forces against the French in North America, commandeers taverns and private homes to feed and house the troops.

==== April–June ====
- April 2 – A naval fleet, led by Commodore William James of the East India Company, captures Tulaji Angre's fortress Suvarnadurg from the Marathas.
- April 15 – A Dictionary of the English Language is published by Samuel Johnson (he had begun the work nine years earlier, in 1746).
- May 3 – France dispatches 3,600 troops to protect its Canadian colonies in Quebec from a British invasion, dispatching 2,400 to Quebec city and 1,200 to Louisbourg in Nova Scotia, unaware that a squadron of 11 fully armed warships from Britain's Royal Navy had sailed toward Canada on April 27.
- May 17 – Spanish missionary Tomas Sanchez and three families establish a settlement on the north side of the Rio Grande in New Spain. Sanchez names it Villa de Laredo. The new settlement is the northernmost part of the colony of Nuevo Santander, founded by José de Escandón, 1st Count of Sierra Gorda, which now comprises parts of the Mexican state of Tamaulipas and the U.S. state of Texas. The portion of Villa de Laredo north of the river later becomes Laredo, Texas; the remaining portion south of the river is later renamed Nuevo Laredo, Tamaulipas.
- May 19 – General Braddock hosts Iroquois leaders Scaroyady, Kaghswaghtaniunt and Silver Heels at Fort Cumberland, the British Army base in the colony of Maryland. The three chiefs pledge their alliance with the British in advance of Braddock's expedition into the Ohio Country.
- May 22 – The Province of Massachusetts Bay sends 2,000 troops to supplement other British Army and colonial forces in Acadia; the troops anchor at Chignecto Bay on June 1.
- May 24 – France completes the construction of Fort Duquesne, its new base to the west of the British colony of Pennsylvania. The British capture the fort during the French and Indian War and rename it Fort Pitt. The site, at the junction of the Allegheny River and the Monongahela River, is now Pittsburgh.
- May 30 – General Braddock's troops begin a difficult trek across the heavily wooded Allegheny Mountains from western Maryland into the Ohio country.
- June 5
  - Scottish chemist Joseph Black describes his discovery of carbon dioxide (fixed air) and magnesium, in a paper to the Medical Society of Edinburgh. The paper is published in 1756 with the title Experiments upon Magnesia alba, Quicklime, and some other alkaline Substances.
  - At the entrance of the Saint Lawrence River, a squadron of Royal Navy ships, under the command of British Admiral Edward Boscawen, intercepts the nine French ships dispatched to save Canada; seven of the nine ships are concealed by fog and are able to reach their destination; another of the transports escapes.
- June 16 – After a two-week siege, the French commander of Fort Beauséjour in North America surrenders to the British, marking the end of "Father Le Loutre's War".
- June 23 – Most of the French troops dispatched to Canada arrive at Quebec, along with the new Governor General of New France, Pierre de Rigaud, Marquis de Vaudreuil-Cavagnial.
- June 27 – Iyoas I becomes the new Emperor of Ethiopia upon the death of his father, Iyasu II

==== July–September ====
- July 9 – French and Indian War – Braddock Expedition: British troops and colonial militiamen are ambushed and suffer a devastating defeat inflicted by French and Indian forces. During the battle, British General Edward Braddock is mortally wounded. Colonel George Washington survives.
- July 17 – In a convoy of ships from Great Britain, returning to India for the East India Company, the lead ship Doddington (on her third voyage) wrecks in Algoa Bay near modern-day Port Elizabeth in South Africa, losing 247 of its 270 passengers and crew, together with a chest of gold coins from Robert Clive worth £33,000. In 1998, 1,400 coins from the wreck site are offered for sale, and in 2002 a portion is given to the South African government. Around twenty survivors of the wreck are eventually able to make safety after an open boat voyage.
- July 25 – The decision to deport the Acadians is made, during meetings of the Nova Scotia Council meeting in Halifax. From September 1755-June 1763, the vast majority of Acadians are deported to one of the following British Colonies in America: Massachusetts, Connecticut, New York, Pennsylvania, Maryland, Virginia, North Carolina, South Carolina and Georgia. Contrary to popular belief, no Acadians are sent to Louisiana. Those sent to Virginia are refused and then sent on to Liverpool, Bristol, Southampton and Penryn in England. In 1758 the Fortress of Louisbourg falls and all of the civilian population of Isle Royal (Cape Breton Island) and Isle St. Jean (Prince Edward Island) are repatriated to France. Among them were several thousand Acadians, who had escaped the deportation by fleeing into those areas. Very few Acadians successfully escape the deportation and do so only by fleeing into some of the northern sections of present day New Brunswick. The event inspires Longfellow to write the epic poem Evangeline.
- August 10 – The Expulsion of the Acadians begins, with the Bay of Fundy Campaign.
- September 2 – A powerful hurricane strikes the east coast of the British colony of North Carolina, killing 150 people and sinking five British and colonial merchant ships at Portsmouth Island.
- September 6 – The Russian Academy of Sciences awards its prize for "the best explanation of the true causes of electricity including their theory" to Switzerland's Johann Euler for his paper Disquisitio de causa physica electricitatis.
- September 8 – French and Indian War – Battle of Lake George: French Army troops, led by Jean Erdman, Baron Dieskau, and Canadian colonists, led by Jacques Legardeur de Saint-Pierre, drive south into Britain's New York province. They are met by British Army troops under General William Johnson being supplemented by 200 Mohawk troops led by the Mohawk war chief, Theyanoguin. After Theyanouguin and other Mohawks are killed in the battle, the clan matrons of the Mohawk nation forbid the men from participating in the war against the French until a French defeat seems certain.
- September 16 – Sir Charles Hanbury-Williams, the new British Minister to Russia, secures an alliance signed by Empress Catherine the Great. The Russian Empire agrees to provide up to 55,000 troops to defend the Electorate of Hanover against invasion by Prussia. At the time, King George II of Great Britain is also the ruler of the German duchy; the Russian troops are provided in return for an annual payment of £600,000.
- September 17 – Jean-Marc Vacheron founds his watch-making company Vacheron Constantin. To this day, Vacheron Constantin is the oldest watchmaker in the world with an uninterrupted watchmaking history since its foundation.
- September 18 – Two slaves, Mark and Phyllis, are publicly executed for the poisoning murder of their master, John Codman in front of a large crowd outside the Middlesex County Courthouse in Cambridge, Massachusetts. Phyllis is burned to death. Mark's execution by hanging is made as an example to other African slaves in the Province of Massachusetts Bay. His body is transported to Charlestown Common in what is now Somerville and displayed on a gibbet for more than 20 years. In 1798, Paul Revere mentions in his memoir that his famous ride of April 18, 1775, started when he first spotted British Army officers at a site "nearly opposite where Mark was hung in chains", I saw two men on Horse back, under a Tree".

==== October–December ====
- October 11 – In west Africa, officials of the Dutch West India Company sign a peace agreement with officials of the Ashanti Empire at Elmina. In return for an annual tribute in gold, the Ashanti maintain peaceful relations with the Europeans in the Dutch Gold Coast colony and the Dutch maintain their settlement at Fort Coenraadsburg. The area is now part of the Central Region of Ghana.
- October 12 – Having completed the Expulsion of the Acadians from St. John's Island (now Prince Edward Island), the British colonial Governor of Nova Scotia, Charles Lawrence, issues a proclamation that his office will receive proposals from English settlers "for the peopling and cultivating as well of the lands vacated by the French, as every other part of this valuable province."
- October 16 – The Penn's Creek massacre is carried out against white settlers who have moved into the Susquehanna Valley in the Pennsylvania colony, in territory also claimed by the Delaware Indians. The Delawares attack the Penn's Creek village, located near what is now Selinsgrove, Pennsylvania, and kill 25 of the 26 men, women and children living there.
- October 17 – The Mount Katla volcano erupts in Iceland and continues ejecting ash for the next 120 days, finally ceasing on February 13. An estimated 1.5 cubic kilometers (1.5 billion cubic meters or 53 billion cubic feet) of tephra is discharged by the volcano.
- October 25 – Yirmisekizzade Mehmed Said Pasha becomes the new Grand Vizier of the Ottoman Empire, the fifth person to serve as the Empire's Vizier in 1755.
- November 1 – More than 40,000 people are killed by the 8.5 magnitude earthquake in Lisbon, Portuguese Empire. The tremor begins at 9:40 in the morning local time off of the Atlantic coast of Portugal and sends a tsunami that strikes the coasts of Portugal, Spain and Morocco.
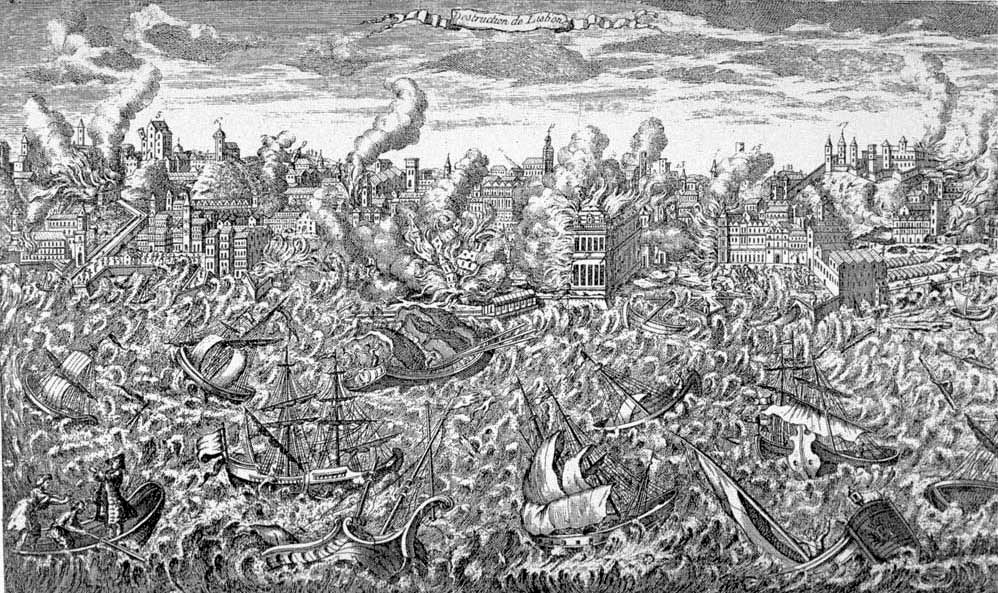
  November 1: Lisbon earthquake kills more than 40,000
- November 18
  - The Corsican Constitution is adopted by Corsican representatives, at the Consulta generale di Corte.
  - The 1755 Cape Ann earthquake occurs in the vicinity of Cape Ann, Massachusetts, causing extensive damage.
- November 25 – King Ferdinand VI of Spain grants the Religious of the Virgin Mary in the Philippines royal protection.
- December 2 – The second Eddystone Lighthouse off the coast of England is destroyed by fire.
- December 17 – Anton, Patriarch of the Georgian Orthodox Church, is dismissed by his opponents on the Ecclesiastical Council and briefly imprisoned for 18 months before being allowed to move to Russia; in 1764, Anton is again made the Georgian Orthodox Church's leader.

==== Date unknown ====
- Wolsey, the clothes manufacturer, is established in Leicester, England; the business celebrates its 250th anniversary in 2005.
- Construction of the Puning Temple complex in Chengde, China is completed, during the reign of the Qianlong Emperor.
- Construction of St Ninian's Church, Tynet, Scotland, the country's oldest surviving post-Reformation Roman Catholic clandestine church, is completed.
- The brine shrimp Artemia salina is first described, in Linnaeus' Systema Naturæ.

=== 1756 ===
==== January–March ====
- January 16 – The Treaty of Westminster is signed between Great Britain and Prussia, guaranteeing the neutrality of the Electorate of Hanover, controlled by King George II of Great Britain.
- January 27 – Wolfgang Amadeus Mozart is born in Salzburg, Austria, to Anna Maria and Leopold Mozart.
- February 7 – Guaraní War: The leader of the Guaraní rebels, Sepé Tiaraju, is killed in a skirmish with Spanish and Portuguese troops.
- February 10 – The massacre of the Guaraní rebels in the Jesuit reduction of Caaibaté takes place in Brazil after their leader, Noicola Neenguiru, defies an ultimatum to surrender by 2:00 in the afternoon. On February 7, Neenguiru's predecessor Sepé Tiaraju has been killed in a brief skirmish. As two o'clock arrives, a combined force of Spanish and Portuguese troops makes an assault on the first of the Seven Towns established as Jesuit missions. Defending their town with cannons made out of bamboo, the Guaraní suffer 1,511 dead, compared to three Spaniards and two Portuguese killed in battle.
- February 14 – Battle of Vijaydurg: The Maratha Navy, that has controlled the western coast of India for the Maratha Empire for more than a century, is destroyed by British attackers fighting for the East India Company. On orders of Royal Navy Admiral Charles Watson, the British capture a Maratha ship (the former British warship HMS Restoration), set it on fire, and then float the burning vessel into the Vijaydurg Port where most of Maratha Admiral Tulaji Angre's ships are anchored. The fire soon spreads to the other ships, destroying one large warship armed with 74 cannons, eight gurabs of 200 tonnes apiece, and sixty galbat ships.
- March 17 – St. Patrick's Day is celebrated in New York City for the first time (at the Crown and Thistle Tavern).

==== April–June ====
- April 1 – Yirmisekizzade Mehmed Said Pasha resigns as Grand Vizier of the Ottoman Empire. He is replaced by Köse Bahir Mustafa Pasha, who has been Grand Vizier from 1752 to 1755.
- April 12 – Siege of Fort St Philip begins when the French under Armand de Vignerot du Plessis, Duke of Richelieu, land near Port Mahón on Menorca and besiege the British garrison here in a prelude to the Seven Years' War.
- May 17 – The Seven Years' War formally begins, when Great Britain declares war on France.
- May 20 – Seven Years' War: Battle of Minorca – The British fleet under John Byng is defeated by the French under Roland-Michel Barrin de La Galissonière.
- June 20 – A garrison of the British Army in India is imprisoned in the Black Hole of Calcutta.
- June 22 – The Coup of 1756, an attempted coup d'état planned by Queen Louisa Ulrika of Sweden, to abolish the rule of the Riksdag of the Estates and reinstate absolute monarchy in Sweden with the support of the Hovpartiet, is exposed and subdued.
- June 25 – The Marine Society is founded in London, the world's oldest seafarers' charity.
- June 29 – Seven Years' War: Siege of Fort St Philip at Port Mahón: The British garrison in Menorca surrenders to the French after two months' siege by the Duke of Richelieu.

==== July–September ====
- July 30 – Bartolomeo Rastrelli presents the newly built Catherine Palace at Tsarskoye Selo to Empress Elizabeth of Russia and her court.
- August 14 – Seven Years' War: French and Indian War – Fort Oswego falls to the French.
- August 29 – King Frederick the Great of Prussia invades Saxony, beginning the Third Silesian War within the Seven Years' War on the European continent.
- September 2 – Abu l-Hasan Ali I, Bey of Tunis is forcibly removed after 23 years as the ruler of the North African emirate by his cousins, who are avenging the overthrow and execution of their father, Husayn in 1735. Hasan Ali surrenders to the rebels and is imprisoned in Algiers, then executed on September 22 on orders of the new Bey of Tunis, Muhammad I ar-Rashid.

==== October–December ====
- October 1 – Seven Years' War: Battle of Lobositz – Frederick defeats an Austrian army under Marshal Maximilian Ulysses, Reichsgraf von Browne.
- October 14 – An "Agreement of Friendship and Trade" is signed by Sultan Osman III and King Frederick V. Denmark appoints an extraordinary representative to the Ottoman Empire.
- November 16 – Thomas Pelham-Holles, the Duke of Newcastle, is forced to resign as Prime Minister of Great Britain after the British lose the Battle of Minorca to the French. The office of Prime Minister remains vacant for eight months with William Pitt and the Duke of Devonshire leading the cabinet.
- December – Seven Years' War – French and Indian War: Militias of the Royal Colony of North Carolina build a fort on the province's western frontier to protect it against natives allied with the French. The fort is named Fort Dobbs in honor of North Carolina Governor Arthur Dobbs, who persuaded the North Carolina legislature to fund the construction a year earlier.
- December 14 – Rev. John Home's tragedy Douglas is performed for the first time in Edinburgh, with overwhelming success, in spite of the opposition of the local church presbytery, who summon Alexander Carlyle to answer for having attended its representation. However, it fails in its early promise to set up a new Scottish dramatic tradition.

==== Date unknown ====
- King Frederick the Great of Prussia forces his country's peasants to grow the unpopular and obscure potato.
- The first chocolate-candy factory begins operations in Germany.
- The town of Gus-Khrustalny is established in Russia, with the setting up of a crystal glass factory.
- Leopold Mozart publishes his book on his method for learning to play the violin, Versuch einer gründlichen Violinschule.

=== 1757 ===
==== January–March ====
- January 2 – Seven Years' War: The British East India Company Army, under the command of Robert Clive, captures Calcutta, India.
- January 5 – Robert-François Damiens makes an unsuccessful assassination attempt on Louis XV of France, who is slightly wounded by the knife attack. Damiens is executed on March 28.
- January 12 – Koca Ragıp Pasha becomes the new Grand Vizier of the Ottoman Empire, and administers the office for seven years until his death in 1763.
- January 17 – Ahmad Shah Durrani leads his Afghan forces to sack Delhi during his invasions of India.
- February 1 – King Louis XV of France dismisses his two most influential advisers. His Secretary of State for War, the Comte d'Argenson and the Secretary of the Navy, Jean-Baptiste de Machault d'Arnouville, are both removed from office at the urging of the King's mistress, Madame de Pompadour.
- February 2 – At Versailles in France, representatives of the Russian Empire and the Austrian Empire enter into an alliance against Prussia, with each nation pledging 80,000 troops. Other clauses to the treaty, not disclosed to the public, commit Austria to pay Russia one million rubles per year during the war to pay for the expenses of 24,000 of the Russian troops, and two million rubles upon the conquest of Silesia (a Prussian province that had been seized from Austria in 1746).
- February 3 – French artist Robert Picault begins the rescue of the frescoes at the King's Chamber of the Palace of Fontainebleau before architect Ange-Jacques Gabrel begins renovations.
- February 5 – The Nawab of Bengal, Siraj ud-Daulah, leads an attempt to retake Calcutta from the British. With just 1,900 soldiers and sailors, but superior cannon power, General Robert Clive forces the Nawab's much larger force into a retreat. The British sustain 194 casualties, but the Bengalis suffer 1,300.
- February 9 – The Nawab and General Clive sign the Treaty of Alinagar, with Bengal compensating the British East India Company for its losses and pledging respect for British control of India.
- February 22 – King Frederick V of Denmark issues an order to create a Lutheran mission for African slaves at the Danish West Indies (the modern-day United States Virgin Islands) at St. Croix.
- February 23 – A revolt against the government of King Joseph I of Portugal takes place in the city of Porto. After the riot's suppression, the King's minister, Sebastião José de Carvalho e Melo, 1st Marquis of Pombal, orders harsh punishments against the perpetrators, carried out in October.
- March 14 – British Royal Navy Admiral John Byng is executed by firing squad on board the ship HMS Monarch in the Solent after his court martial conviction for failing in the Battle of Minorca (1756) to save British troops who had been besieged by a numerically superior French force in the Siege of Fort St Philip. General Edward Cornwallis, the ranking British Army officer at the battle, is exonerated of charges of dereliction of duty, but his career is ruined. Byng's execution is the origin of the phrase "In this country, it is wise to kill an admiral from time to time to encourage the others", coined by Voltaire in his novel Candide.
- March 21 – Sweden signs an alliance treaty with France and Austria in the multinational effort to remove King Frederick the Great, even though Queen Consort Ulrika of Sweden is Frederick's sister. Sweden agrees to contribute 25,000 troops to the French and Austrian force.
- March 23 – The British East India Company takes control of Chandannagar and forces out the French Indian administrators.
- March 28 – Robert-François Damiens is tortured, then dismembered and his remains burned in public for his January 5 assassination attempt on King Louis XV of France, the last person in France to suffer this punishment.
- March 30 – The Rigshospitalet, national hospital of Denmark, is founded at Copenhagen.

==== April–June ====
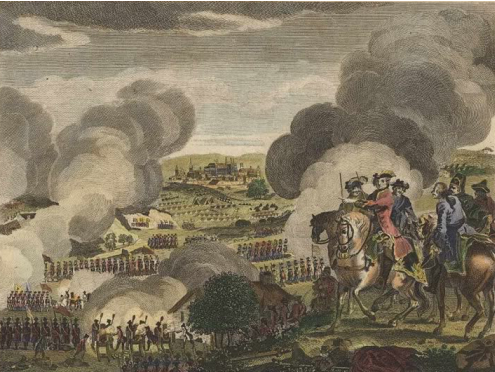
May 6: The Battle of Prague takes place as a Bohemian siege of the Bohemian capital.

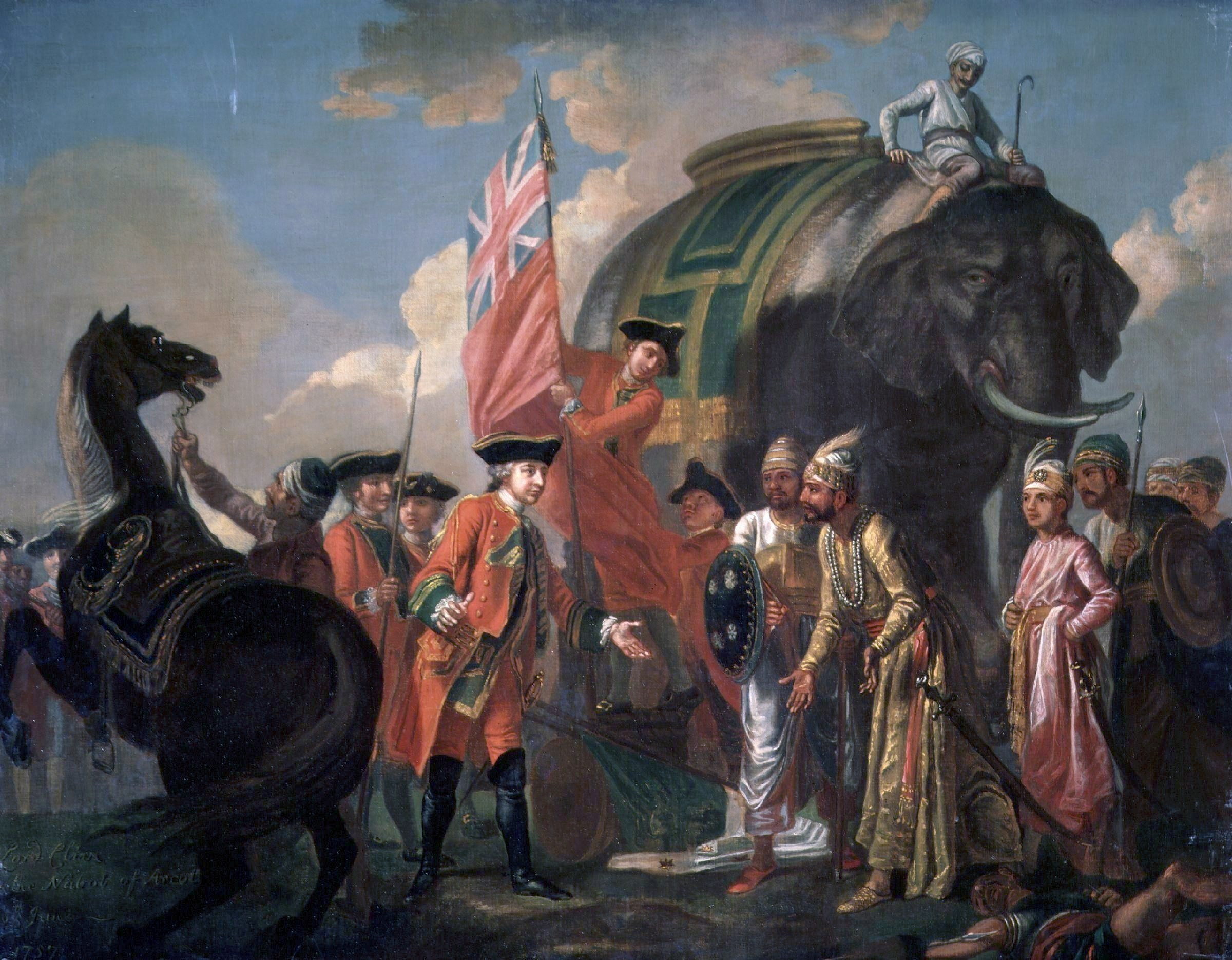
June 23: The Battle of Plassey takes place in India.

- April 6 – William Pitt resigns from the government of Great Britain after Prince William, Duke of Cumberland refuses to command the British forces in Germany in the Seven Years' War and following several military reverses in Britain's fight against France in America. A Caretaker Ministry takes power led by William Cavendish, 4th Duke of Devonshire. Pitt is recalled to government in early July.
- April 16
  - The works of astronomer Galileo Galilei espousing heliocentrism are removed (with the approval of Pope Benedict XIV) from the Index Librorum Prohibitorum list of books banned by Roman Catholic Church, along with "all books teaching the earth's motion and the sun's immobility". Other works of heliocentrists Galileo, Nicolaus Copernicus, Johannes Kepler, Diego de Zúñiga and Paolo Foscarini remain on the list.
  - In the wake of public unrest in France, the King's Council issues a decree that bars anyone from writing, printing anything that would tend toward émouvoir les esprits (stir up popular sentiment) against the government, with violations punishable by death.
- April 17 – The Spanish mission of Mission Santa Cruz de San Sabá is founded by Spanish missionary families on the banks of the San Saba River near modern day Menard, Texas. Less than two years later, the European settlement is destroyed by the native Comanche Indians who live in the area.
- April 21 – Battle of Reichenberg: Marshal Augustus William von Bevern enters Bohemia with a Prussian army (some 15,000 men). At Reichenberg he encounters the Austrians under command of General Christian Moritz von Königsegg. Von Bevern defeats the Austrian troops and captures large quantities of supplies. He continues his advance on Prague.
- April 29 – Inside the house at Stratford-upon-Avon in England known as Shakespeare's Birthplace, a bricklayer, identified only as "Mosely", re-tiling the roof, discovers a supposed pro-Catholic testament of John Shakespeare, father of William Shakespeare, more than 150 years after the elder's death. The find starts "what remains one of the most controversial topics in Shakespeare studies" because of disagreements over its authenticity and date.
- May 1 – France and Austria sign a second Treaty of Versailles, committing France to sending an additional 105,000 troops to the war against Prussia, and to pay expenses to Austria at the rate of 12 million florins annually.
- May 6 – Seven Years' War: Battle of Prague – Frederick the Great defeats an Austrian army, and begins to besiege the city.
- June 18 – Seven Years' War: Battle of Kolín – Frederick is defeated by an Austrian army under Marshal Daun, forcing him to evacuate Bohemia.
- June 23 – Battle of Plassey: 3,000 troops serving with the British East India Company under Robert Clive defeat a 50,000 strong Indian army under Siraj ud-Daulah with the help of Mir Jafar, at Plassey in India, marking the first victory of the East India Company over India, which lasts until 1857.
- June 25
  - The Duke of Devonshire resigns as Prime Minister of Great Britain after being unable to conduct governmental affairs without William Pitt.
  - The 1755 rebellion against the Chinese Empire by Mongolian Oirat Prince Amursana is met by a Chinese army of 10,000 attackers against Amursana's 2,500 man force at their capital at Bor Tal. The rebels hold out until July 17.

==== July–September ====
- July 2 – The Duke of Newcastle is asked to form a new government of Great Britain and fills the office of Prime Minister of Great Britain, after his forced resignation eight months earlier. Pitt is recalled to conduct Britain's foreign and military affairs and given greater control.
- July 17 – Amursana's Mongolian rebellion against the Chinese Empire is crushed after a battle of 17 days, and the survivors flee to Russia, where Amursana unsuccessfully seeks Russian aid.
- July 26 – Seven Years' War: Battle of Hastenbeck – An Anglo-Hanoverian army under the Duke of Cumberland is defeated by the French under Louis d'Estrées, and forced out of Hanover.
- August 3–9 – French and Indian War: A French army under Louis-Joseph de Montcalm forces the English to surrender Fort William Henry. The French army's Indian allies slaughter the surviving men, women and children.
- August 11 – In the Battle of Delhi, the capital city of the Mughal Empire is retaken by Maratha Empire leader Raghunathrao from Najib ad-Dawlah, who flees to refuge in the royal palace, the Red Fort.
- August 30 – Seven Years' War: Battle of Gross-Jägersdorf – A Prussian army under Hans von Lehwaldt is defeated by the Russian army of Marshal Stepan Apraksin.
- September 6 – The life of Najib ad-Dawlah is spared by Raghunathrao upon the intercession of General Malhar Rao Holkar. Najib and his family are permitted to leave the Fort along with most of their property, and the Emperor Alamgir II is restored to the Mughal throne as a nominal ruler.
- September 8 – The Convention of Klosterzeven is signed at the Lower Saxony town of Bremervörde by the Duke of Cumberland following his defeat at the July 26 Battle of Hastenbeck by the French Army Marshal, the Duke of Richelieu. The treaty provides for the Army of the Electorate of Hanover to be reduced to a token force and for the French Army to occupy Hanover and most of northwest Germany. At the time, King George II of Great Britain is also the Elector of Hanover, and it is later said that "The terms proved worse than either George or his ministers had wanted or expected."
- September 13 – Pomeranian War: a column of troops from Sweden begins the surprise invasion of Prussia, setting up a pontoon bridge across the Peene River that marks the boundary between Swedish Pomerania and northern Prussia. After crossing at Loitz in the early morning hours, the troops march 10 kilometres (6.2 mi) and begin the occupation of the undefended Prussian town of Demmin. Hours later, another Swedish infantry regiment charges across the border into the Prussian town of Anklam, where the city gate had been left open.
- September 23 – The "Raid on Rochefort" is carried out as a pre-emptive strike by Great Britain to neutralize France's Arsenal de Rochefort before the French Navy can carry out plans to invade England. Led by Royal Navy Admiral Edward Hawke, HMS Neptune and six other vessels sail in and capture the Île-d'Aix and its battery of cannons, effectively blocking the departure of any ships from the mouth of the Charante river.

==== October–December ====
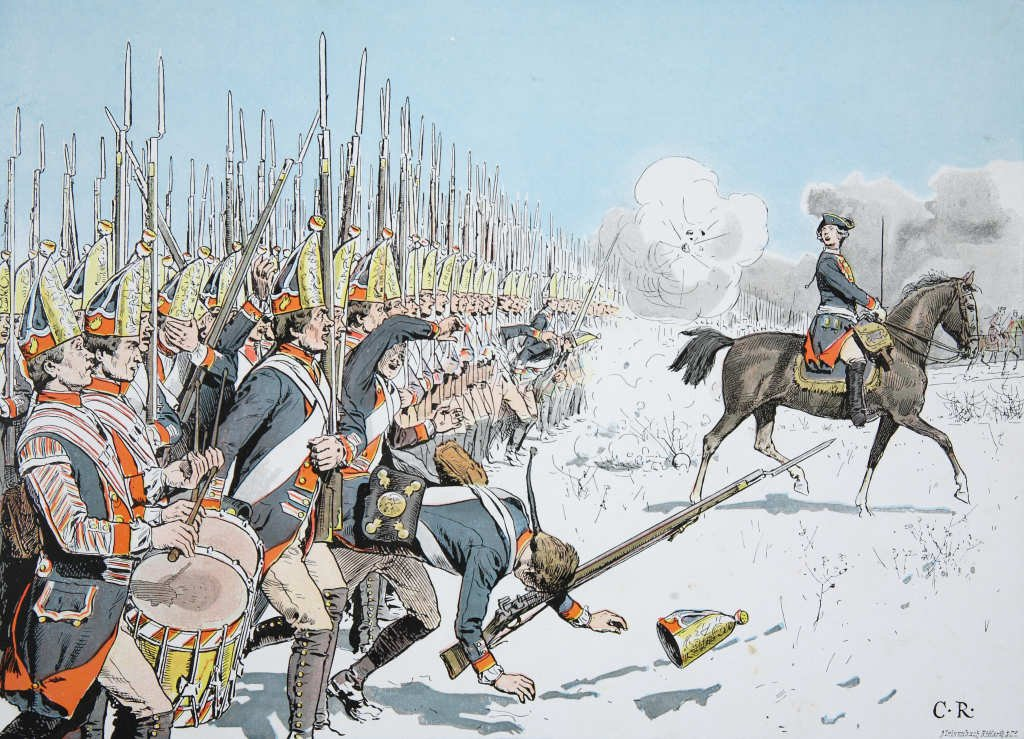
December 5: King Frederick of Prussia defeats the Austrian army in the Battle of Leuthen.

- October 4 – Bearing British flags, two French privateers sail up the Gambia River and attempt to capture the British fort on James Island, but their ruse is discovered the next day before they can stage their attack. The two ships are captured by the Royal Navy after retreating
- October 14 – Of the 478 people arrested, and 442 (including 50 women and young boys) convicted, for their roles in the Porto riot in February, 13 men and one woman are hanged; afterwards, their bodies are then quartered and the severed limbs are publicly displayed on spikes. Another 49 men and 10 women are exiled to Portuguese colonies in Africa and India, and the other convicts are either flogged, imprisoned or pressed into service rowing galley ships.
- October 16 – Seven Years' War: Hungarian raiders plunder Berlin, Prussia.
- October 24 (10 Safar 1171 A.H.) – 1757 Hajj caravan raid: Bedouin warriors of the Bani Sakher confederacy conduct a massive assault against a caravan of thousands of Muslim travelers who are on their way back to Damascus after the Hajj, the pilgrimage to Mecca. The attack, made at Hallat Ammar after the group has been resupplied at Tabuk, leads to the annihilation of 20,000 of the pilgrims. Those who are not killed outright die later in the desert from thirst and starvation. According to one Arabic source, the largest attack takes place on October 24.
- October 30 – Osman III dies, and is succeeded as Ottoman Sultan by Mustafa III.
- October 31 – News of the massacre of Muslim pilgrims first reaches Damascus; the Ottoman officials who had been in charge of protecting the pilgrimage are executed by beheading.
- November 5 – Seven Years' War: Battle of Rossbach – Frederick defeats the French-Imperial army under the Duc de Soubise and Prince Joseph of Saxe-Hildburghausen, forcing the French to withdraw from Saxony.
- November 10 – King Abdallah IV of Morocco dies and is succeeded by his son, who takes the throne as King Mohammed III and reigns until 1790.
- November 22 – Seven Years' War: Battle of Breslau – An Austrian army under Prince Charles Alexander of Lorraine defeats the Prussian army of Wilhelm of Brunswick-Bevern, and forces the Prussians behind the Oder.
- December 5 – Seven Years' War: Battle of Leuthen – Frederick defeats Prince Charles's Austrian army, in what is generally considered the Prussian king's greatest tactical victory.
- December 6 – In Buddhist tradition, Jigme Lingpa discovers the Longchen Nyingthig terma through a meditative vision, which brings him to Boudhanath. The Longchen Nyingtig is a popular cycle of teachings in the Nyingma school of Tibetan Buddhism.
- December 14 – Battle of Khresili: King Solomon I of Imereti defeats the Ottoman army and an allied faction of nobles, in what becomes western Georgia.
- December 24 – The Pratt-Yorke opinion distinguishes British overseas territories acquired by conquest from those acquired by private treaty: while the Crown of Great Britain enjoys sovereignty over both, only the property of the former is vested in the Crown.
- December 30 – James Abercrombie replaces James Mure-Campbell, 5th Earl of Loudoun as supreme commander in the British American colonies. Abercrombie is replaced himself, after failing to take the fort at Ticonderoga.

==== Date unknown ====
- Nam tiến, the southward expansion of the territory of Vietnam into the Indochina Peninsula, is concluded.
- A firman (decree) of Ottoman sultan Osman III (d. October 30) preserves the division of ownership and responsibilities of various Christian holy places in Jerusalem and Bethlehem (e.g. the former's Church of the Holy Sepulchre); this becomes established as the Status Quo in international law.
- Robert Wood publishes The ruins of Balbec, otherwise Heliopolis in Coelosyria in English and French, making the ancient city of Baalbek, Syria known to the West.
- Emanuel Swedenborg claims to have witnessed the Last Judgment occurring in the spiritual world.

=== 1758 ===
==== January–March ====
- January 1 – Swedish biologist Carl Linnaeus (Carl von Linné) publishes in Stockholm the first volume (Animalia) of the 10th edition of Systema Naturae, the starting point of modern zoological nomenclature, introducing binomial nomenclature for animals to his established system of Linnaean taxonomy. Among the first examples of his system of identifying an organism by genus and then species, Linnaeus identifies the lamprey with the name Petromyzon marinus. He introduces the term Homo sapiens. (Date of January 1 assigned retrospectively.)
- January 20 – At Cap-Haïtien in Haiti, former slave turned rebel François Mackandal is executed by the French colonial government by being burned at the stake.
- January 22 – Russian troops under the command of William Fermor invade East Prussia and capture Königsberg with 34,000 soldiers; although the city is later abandoned by Russia after the Seven Years' War ends, the city again comes under Russian control in 1945 during World War II and is now named Kaliningrad.
- February 22 – A fleet of 158 British Royal Navy warships, under the command of Admiral Edward Boscawen, departs from Plymouth toward North America in an effort to conquer the French Canadian territories of New France. Many of the sailors die of nutritional deficiencies along the way, including the scurvy that kills 26 of the crew of HMS Pembroke, captained by future world explorer James Cook on his first long voyage.
- February 23 – Jonathan Edwards, the famed English theologian who had assumed the presidency of what is now Princeton University only a week earlier, sets an example for students and faculty by publicly receiving an inoculation against smallpox. Unfortunately, the vaccine contains live smallpox; Edwards develops the disease and dies on March 22 at the age of 54.
- March 16 – Members of the Comanche Nation loot and destroy the Spanish Mission Santa Cruz de San Sabá (near modern-day Menard, Texas) and kill eight of the people there, including the mission leader, Father Alonso Giraldo de Terreros.

==== April–June ====
- April 29 – Battle of Cuddalore: A British fleet under Sir George Pocock engages the French fleet of Anne Antoine, Comte d'Aché indecisively near Madras.
- May 21 – Seven Years' War – French and Indian War: Mary Campbell is abducted from her home in Pennsylvania by members of the Lenape Nation.
- June 8 – Seven Years' War – French and Indian War: Siege of Louisbourg: James Wolfe's attack at Louisbourg, Nova Scotia, commences.

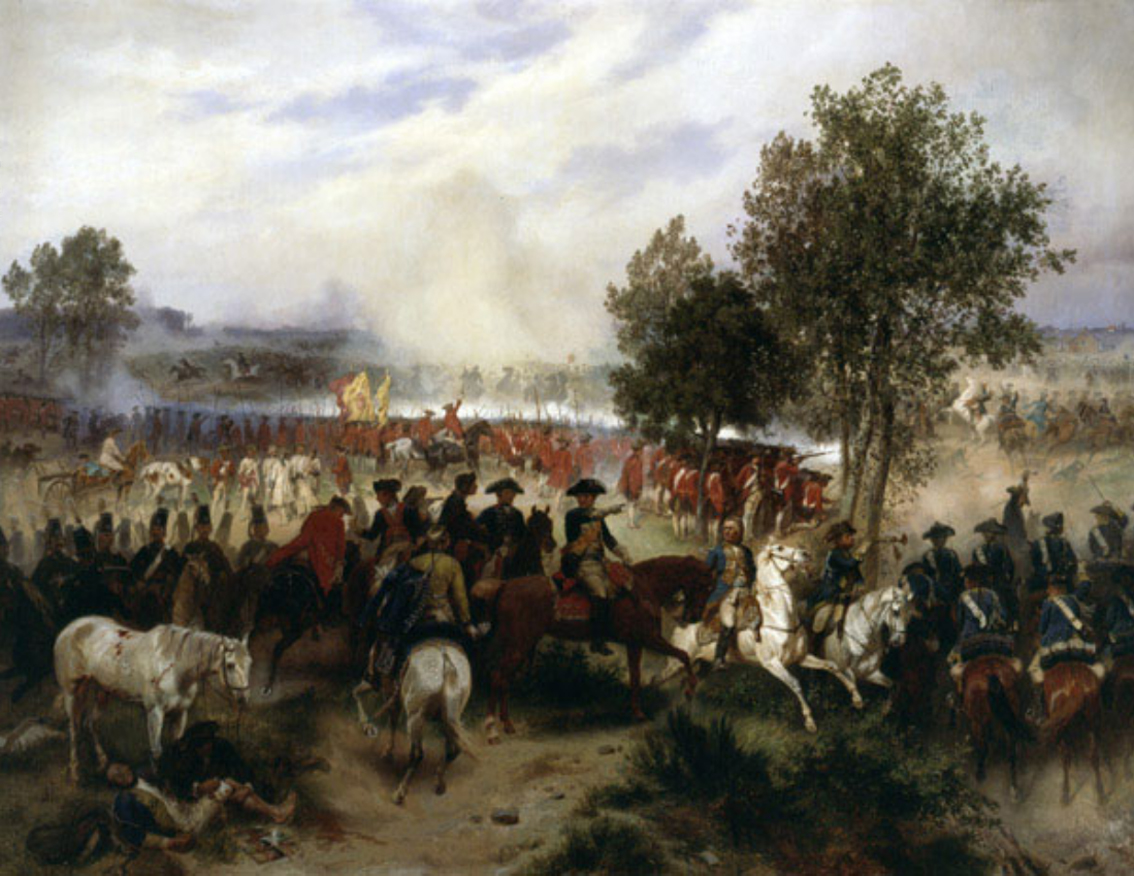
June 23: Battle of Krefeld

- June 9–10 – Spanish-Barbary Wars – Battle of Cape Palos: a Spanish squadron of three ships of the line defeats a Barbary squadron made up of a ship of the line and a frigate.
- June 23 – Seven Years' War – Battle of Krefeld: Anglo-Hanoverian forces under Ferdinand of Brunswick defeat the French.
- June 30 – Seven Years' War – Battle of Domstadtl: Austrian forces under Ernst Gideon von Laudon and Joseph von Siskovits rout an enormous convoy with supplies for the Prussian army, guarded by strong troops of Hans Joachim von Zieten.

==== July–September ====
- July 6
  - Pope Clement XIII succeeds Pope Benedict XIV, as the 248th pope.
  - Seven Years' War – Battle of Bernetz Brook: British troops defeat the French.
- July 8 – Seven Years' War: French and Indian War: French forces hold Fort Carillon against the British at Ticonderoga, New York.
- July 25 – Seven Years' War – French and Indian War: The island battery at Fortress Louisbourg is silenced, and all French warships are destroyed or taken.
- August 3 – Seven Years' War – Battle of Negapatam: Off the coast of India, Admiral Pocock again engages d'Aché's French fleet, this time with more success.

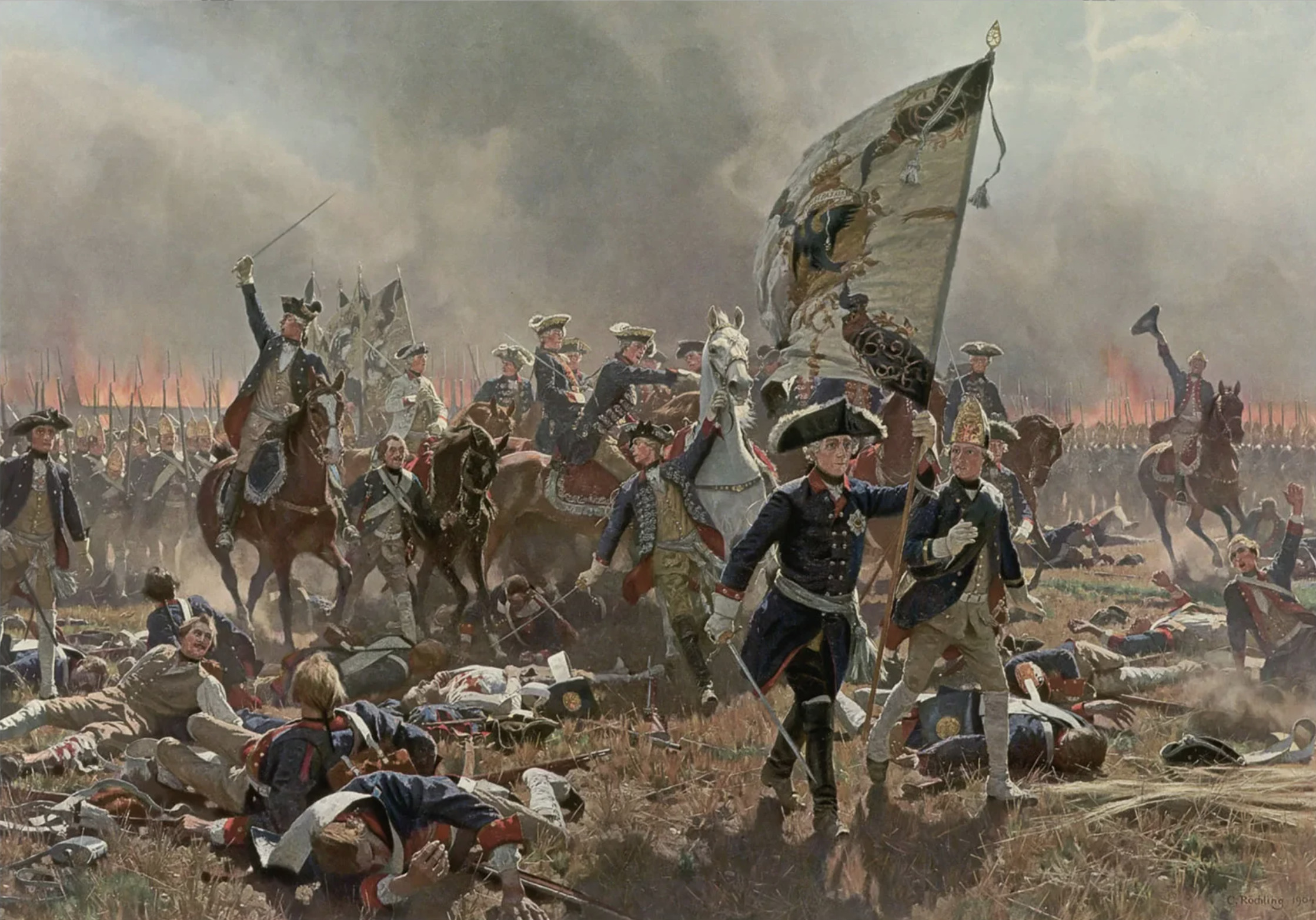
August 25: Battle of Zorndorf

- August 25 – Seven Years' War – Battle of Zorndorf: Frederick halts the Russian army of Count Wilhelm Fermor near the Oder.
- August 27 – Seven Years' War – British troops under the command of Colonel John Bradstreet capture Fort Frontenac (near the site of what is now Kingston, Ontario) from the French.
- September 3 – Távora affair: Joseph I of Portugal survives an assassination attempt.
- September 14 – Seven Years' War – French and Indian War: Battle of Fort Duquesne: A British attack on Fort Duquesne (modern-day Pittsburgh) is defeated.

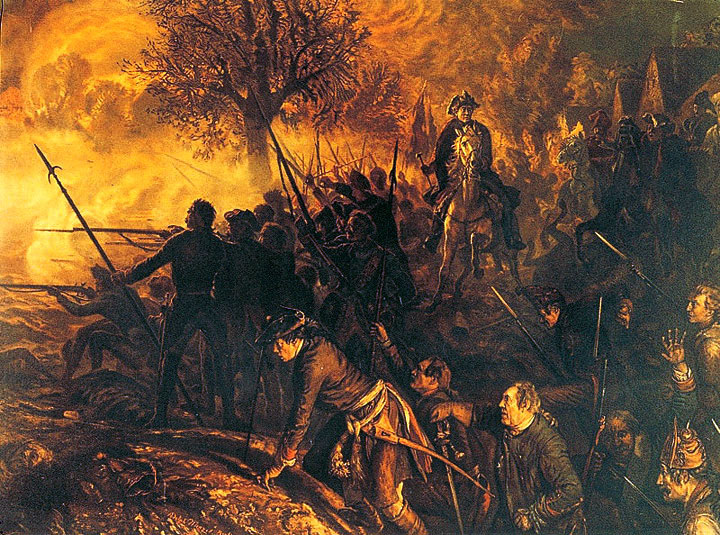
October 14: Battle of Hochkirch

==== October–December ====
- October 14 – Seven Years' War: Battle of Hochkirch: Frederick loses a hard-fought battle against the Austrians under Marshal Leopold von Daun, who besieges Dresden.
- November 25 – Seven Years' War: French and Indian War: French forces abandon Fort Duquesne to the British, who then name the area Pittsburgh.
- December 13 – The ship Duke William sinks in the North Atlantic, with the loss of over 360 lives, while deporting Acadians from Prince Edward Island to France.
- December 25 – Halley's Comet is sighted by Johann Georg Palitzsch, confirming Edmund Halley's 1705 prediction of its periodicity.

==== Date unknown ====
- The French build the first European settlement in what becomes Erie County, New York, at the mouth of Buffalo Creek.
- Rudjer Boscovich publishes his atomic theory, in Theoria philosophiae naturalis redacta ad unicam legem virium in nalura existentium.
- A fire destroys parts of Christiania, Norway.
- Marquis Gabriel de Lernay, a French officer captured during the Seven Years' War, establishes a military lodge in Berlin, with the help of Baron de Printzen, master of The Three Globes Lodge at Berlin, and Philipp Samuel Rosa, a disgraced former pastor.
- Okadaya (岡田屋), predecessor of AEON, a multiple retailer group, founded in Yokkaichi, Japan.
- J. R. Geigy, predecessor of Novartis, a global pharmaceutical brand, founded in Basel, Switzerland.

=== 1759 ===
==== January–March ====
- January 6 – George Washington marries Martha Dandridge Custis.
- January 11 – In Philadelphia, the first American life insurance company is incorporated.
- January 13 – Távora affair: The Távora family is executed, following accusations of the attempted regicide of Joseph I of Portugal.
- January 15
  - The British Museum opens at Montagu House in London after six years of development.
  - Voltaire's satire Candide is published simultaneously in five countries.
- January 27 – Battle of Río Bueno: Spanish forces, led by Juan Antonio Garretón, defeat indigenous Huilliches of southern Chile.
- February 12 – Ali II ibn Hussein becomes the new Ruler of Tunisia upon the death of his brother, Muhammad I ar-Rashid. Ali reigns for 23 years until his death in 1782.
- February 16 – The Comte de Lally (Thomas Lally) ends the French Army's two-month siege of the British Indian fort at Madras and retreats.
- February 17 – "The greatest fleet that had ever put out for America" departs from Portsmouth with 250 ships (including 49 Royal Navy warships under the command of Vice Admiral Charles Saunders, on a mission to capture French-controlled Quebec. The ships bring 14,000 sailors, marines and British Army troops under the command of Major General James Wolfe, along with another 7,000 men in merchant service.
- March 4–November 20 – Étienne de Silhouette serves as Controller-General of France and attempts major financial reforms.

==== April–June ====
- April 13 – Seven Years' War – Battle of Bergen: A French army defeats Ferdinand, Duke of Brunswick in Hesse.
- May 1 – Josiah Wedgwood founds the Wedgwood pottery in England.
- May 10 – The Macedonian Hussar Regiment is formed and starts to assist the Russian Empire in the Seven Years' War.
- June 4 – After arriving at Canada, the Royal Navy fleet sails out of British-controlled Halifax toward the St. Lawrence River to prepare the invasion of French Quebec.
- June 15 – The first vascular surgery in history is performed by a Dr. Hallowell (whose first name has been lost) at Newcastle upon Tyne in England, who uses suture repair rather than a tying off with a ligature to repair an aneurysm on a patient's brachial artery. The case is reported in 1761 by Dr. Richard Lambert in the paper "A new technique of treating an aneurysm", published in the journal Medical Observations and Inquiries. The new procedure of reconstructing a damaged artery replaces the practice of ligation that had risked the amputation of a limb or organ failure.
- June 26 – After their fleet finishes navigation of the St. Lawrence and arriving at the Île d'Orléans, British troops go ashore on France's North American territory and begin the siege of Quebec City.

==== July–September ====
- July 19 – The Great Stockholm Fire 1759 breaks out at Södermalm in Stockholm, Sweden.
- July 25 – Seven Years' War (French and Indian War): In Canada, British forces capture Fort Niagara from the French, who subsequently abandon Fort Rouillé.
- July 26–27 – Seven Years' War (French and Indian War) – Battle of Ticonderoga: At the southern end of Lake Champlain, French forces withdraw from Fort Carillon, which is taken by the British under General Amherst, and renamed Fort Ticonderoga.
- August 1 – Battle of Minden: Anglo–Hanoverian forces under Ferdinand of Brunswick defeat the French army of the Duc de Broglie, but due to the disobedience of the English cavalry commander Lord George Sackville, the French are able to withdraw unmolested.
- August 10 – Ferdinand VI of Spain dies, and is succeeded by his half-brother Charles III. Charles resigns the thrones of Naples and Sicily to his third son, Ferdinand IV.

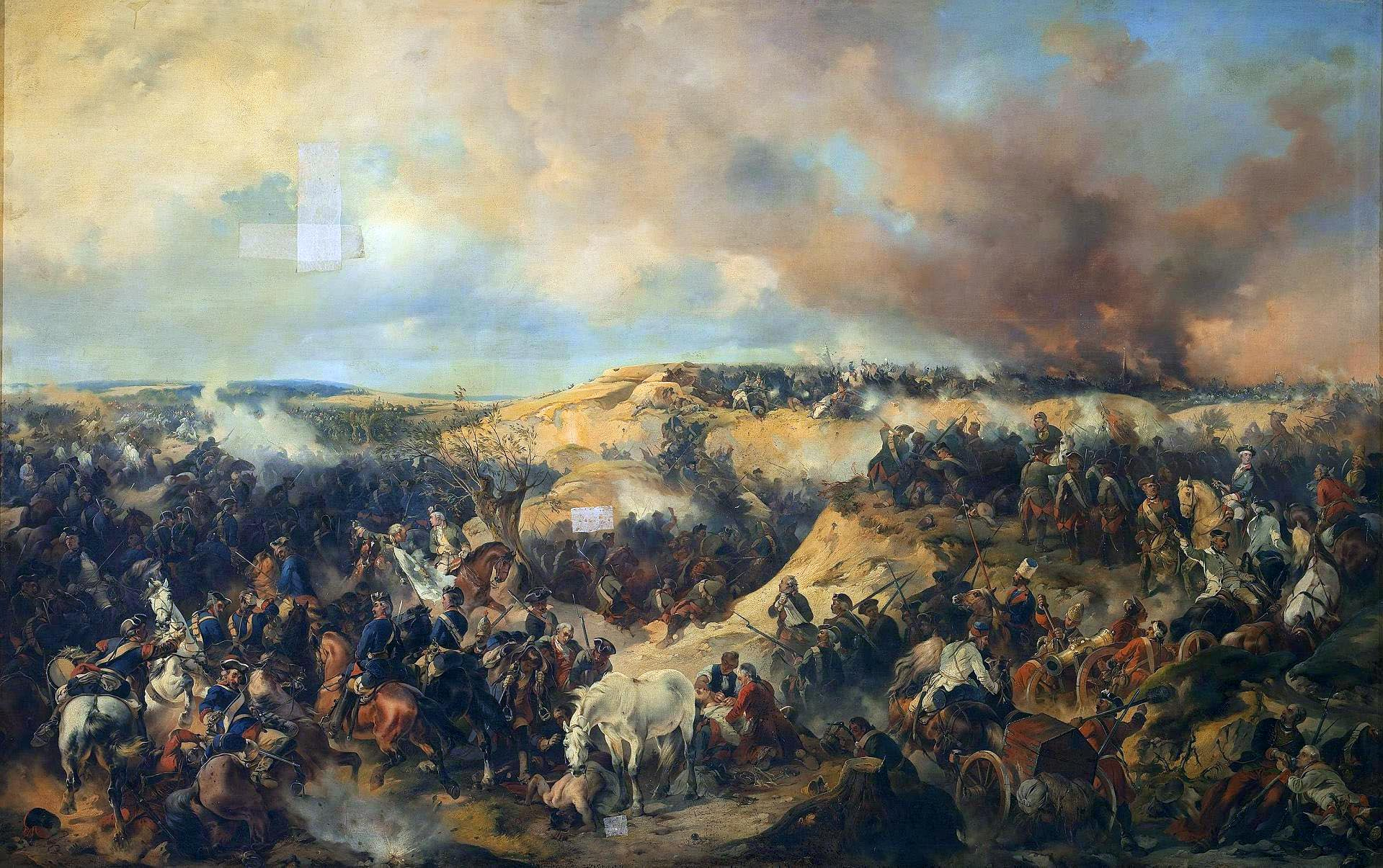
August 12: Battle of Kunersdorf.

- August 12 – Battle of Kunersdorf: Frederick the Great is rebuffed in bloody assaults, by the combined Austro–Russian army of Pyotr Saltykov and Ernst von Laudon. This is one of Frederick's greatest defeats.
- August 18 – Battle of Lagos: The British fleet of Edward Boscawen defeats a French force under Commodore Jean-François de La Clue-Sabran off the Portuguese coast.
- September 10 – Battle of Pondicherry: An inconclusive naval battle is fought off the coast of India, between the French Admiral d'Aché and the British under George Pocock. The French forces are badly damaged and sail home, never to return.
- September 13 – Seven Years' War (French and Indian War) – Battle of the Plains of Abraham: Quebec falls to British forces, following General Wolfe's victory just outside the city. Both the French Commander (the Marquis de Montcalm) and the British General James Wolfe are fatally wounded.
- September 14 – Carrington Bowles publishes A Journey Through Europe, a board game designed by John Jefferys, the earliest board game whose designer's name is known.

==== October–December ====
- October 16 – Smeaton's Tower, John Smeaton’s Eddystone Lighthouse off the coast of South West England, is first illuminated.
- October 18 – A fire destroys the Macedonian city of Salonika, reducing 4,000 houses to ashes.
- October 30 – Near East earthquakes of 1759: The first event in an earthquake doublet occurs to the north of the Sea of Galilee, with a surface wave magnitude of 6.6 and a maximum Mercalli intensity of VIII–IX (Severe–Violent). About 2,000 are killed in Safed.
- November 20 – Battle of Quiberon Bay: The British fleet of Sir Edward Hawke defeats a French fleet under Marshal de Conflans, near the coast of Brittany. This is the decisive naval engagement of the Seven Years' War – after this, the French are no longer able to field a significant fleet.

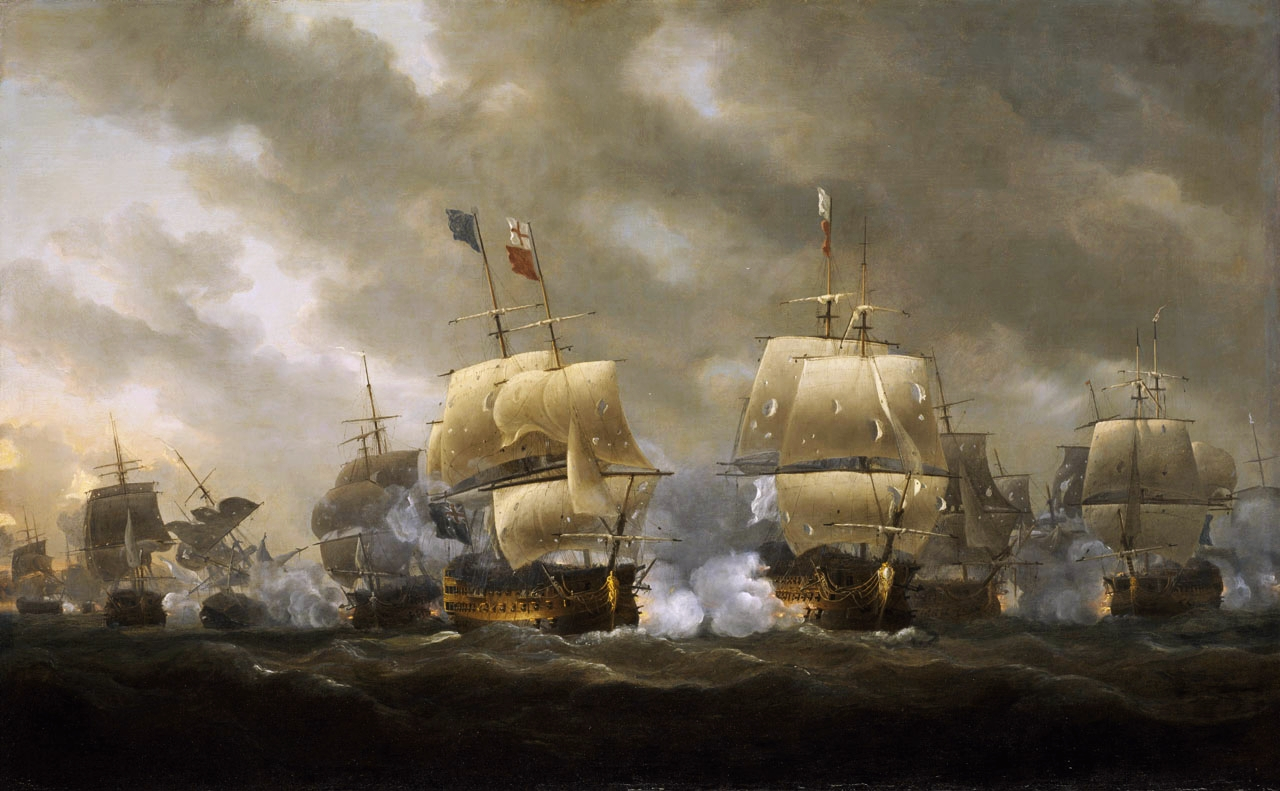
November 20: Battle of Quiberon Bay

- November 21 – Battle of Maxen: The Austrian army of Marshal von Daun cuts off and forces the surrender of a Prussian force, under Friedrich von Finck.
- November 25 – Near East earthquakes of 1759: The second and stronger event in an earthquake doublet occurs to the east of Beirut, with a surface wave magnitude of 7.4 and a maximum Mercalli intensity of IX (Violent), destroying all the villages in the Beqaa Valley.
- November 29 – Alamgir II, the Mughal Emperor of India, is assassinated in a conspiracy orchestrated by his Prime Minister, Imad-ul-Mulk. The Shah Alam II, a grandson of the 17th century Emperor Aurangzeb, is made the new Mughal Emperor.
- December 6 – The Germantown Union School (later called Germantown Academy), America's oldest nonsectarian day school, is founded.
- December 10 – Shah Jahan III is installed as the puppet ruler of India's Mughal Empire eleven days after the death of Alamgir II, but is removed after a reign of only ten months.
- December 31 – The Guinness Brewery is leased by Arthur Guinness in St. James's Gate, Dublin, Ireland, for the brewing of Guinness.

==== Date unknown ====
- Adam Smith publishes his Theory of Moral Sentiments, embodying some of his Glasgow lectures.
- The town of Egedesminde (modern Aasiaat) is founded in Greenland.
- English clockmaker John Harrison produces his "No. 1 sea watch" (H4), the first successful marine chronometer.
- The Kew Gardens are established in England by Princess Augusta of Saxe-Gotha, the mother of George III.
- Churton Town, the Orange County, North Carolina county seat laid out in 1754, is renamed Childsburgh, in honor of North Carolina attorney general Thomas Child. It is later renamed Hillsborough in 1766.
- Fire destroys 250 houses in Stockholm.
- Madame du Coudray publishes Abrégé de l'art des accouchements (The Art of Obstetrics), and the French government authorizes her to carry her instruction "throughout the realm" and promises financial support.

== Births ==
1750

- January 24 – Nicolas Bergasse, French lawyer (d. 1832)
- January 24 – Helen Gloag, Scottish-born enslaved Empress of Morocco (d. 1790)
- March 16 – Caroline Herschel, German astronomer (d. 1848)
- April – Joanna Southcott, British religious fanatic (d. 1814)
- April 17 – François de Neufchâteau, French statesman, intellectual figure (d. 1828)
- May 2 – John André, British Army officer of the American Revolutionary War (d. 1780)
- May 20 – Stephen Girard, French-American banker, fourth richest American of all time (d. 1831)
- May 23 – Adamson Tannehill, American general and politician (d. 1820)
- May 28 – Diogo de Carvalho e Sampayo, Portuguese diplomat, scientist (d. 1807)
- May 31 – Karl August von Hardenberg, Prussian politician (d. 1822)
- June 6 – William Morgan, British statistician, actuary (d. 1833)
- July 5 – Aimé Argand, Swiss physicist, inventor (d. 1803)
- July 9 – Louise Marie Thérèse Bathilde d'Orléans, last princess of Condé (d.1822)
- July 25 – Henry Knox, military officer of the Continental Army and later the United States Army, 1st United States Secretary of War (d. 1806)

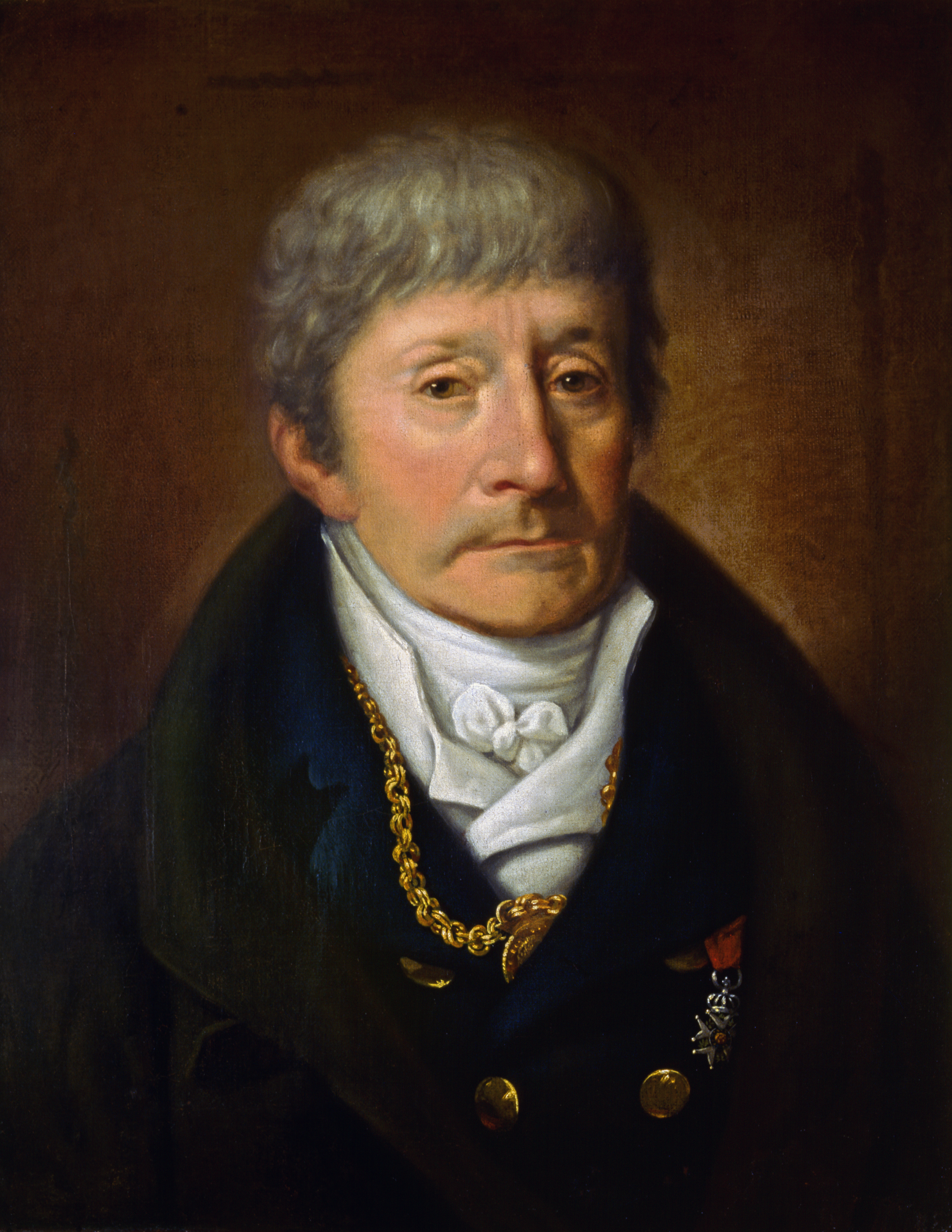
Antonio Salieri

- August 18 – Antonio Salieri, Italian composer (d. 1825)
- September 26 – Cuthbert Collingwood, 1st Baron Collingwood, British admiral (d. 1810)
- October 7 – Abraham Woodhull, Patriot spy during the American Revolutionary War (d. 1826)
- October 25 – Marie Le Masson Le Golft, French naturalist (b. 1826)
- October 31 – Leonor de Almeida Portugal, 4th Marquise of Alorna, Portuguese painter and poet (d. 1839)
- November 6 – Carlo Aurelio Widmann, Venetian nobleman and admiral (d. 1798)
- November 7 – Friedrich Leopold zu Stolberg-Stolberg, German poet (d. 1819)

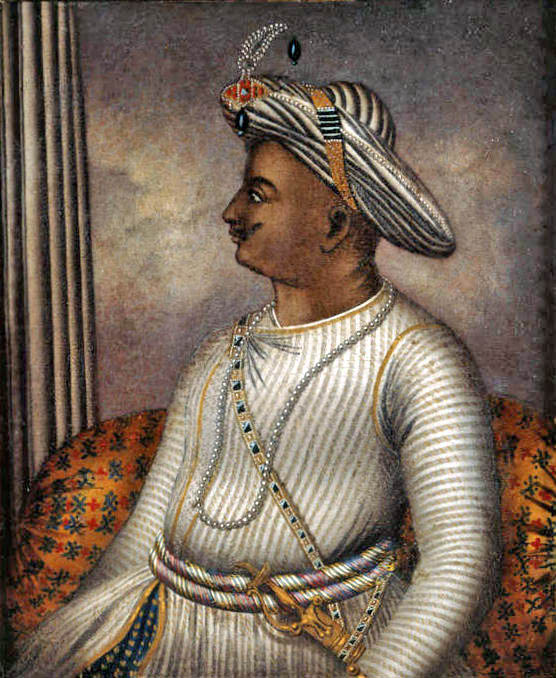
Tipu Sultan

- November 10 – Tipu Sultan, Sultan of Mysore (d. 1799)
- December 23 – Frederick Augustus I of Saxony (d. 1827)
- date unknown
  - Toypurina, Medicine woman of the Tongva nation and rebel leader (d. 1799)
  - Adwaita, Oldest tortoise (d. 2006) (alleged birth year; awaiting C-14 verification)
  - Urszula Zamoyska, Polish noblewoman and socialite (d. 1808)
  - Elizabeth Ryves, Irish writer and translator (d. 1797)
  - Moulvi Syed Qudratullah, Bengali judge (d. 1839)
  - Sengai Gibon, Japanese monk (d. 1837)

1751

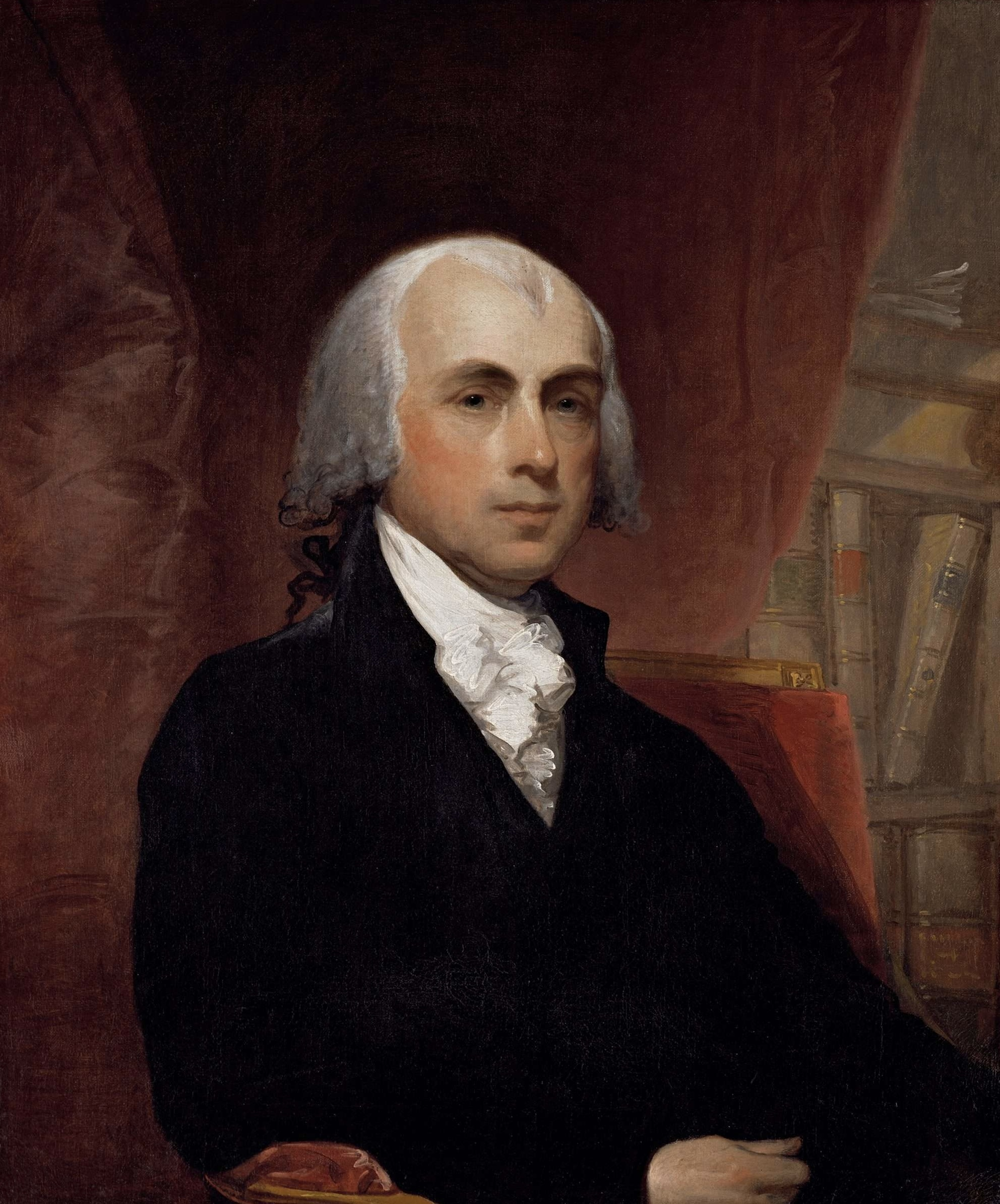
James Madison

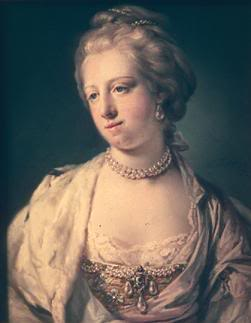
Caroline Matilda

- January 12 – Ferdinand I of the Two Sicilies (d. 1825)
- February 15 – Johann Heinrich Wilhelm Tischbein, German painter (d. 1829)
- February 20 – Johann Heinrich Voss, German poet (d. 1826)
- March 1 – Armand-Marie-Jacques de Chastenet, Marquis of Puységur, French mesmerist (d. 1825)
- March 9 – Maria Antonia Fernandez, Spanish flamenco singer, dancer (d. 1787)
- March 16 – James Madison, fourth President of the United States (d. 1836)
- April 5 – Marie-Aimée Lullin, Swiss entomologist (d. 1822)
- May 7 – Stephen Badlam, American artisan and military officer (d. 1815)
- May 24 – Charles Emmanuel IV of Savoy, King of Sardinia (d. 1819)
- June 4 – John Scott, 1st Earl of Eldon, Lord Chancellor of Great Britain (d. 1838)
- June 17 – Joshua Humphreys, American naval architect (d. 1838)
- June 23 – Gregoria Apaza, Bolivian indigenous leader (d. 1782)
- July 11 – Caroline Matilda, British princess, queen consort of Denmark (d. 1775)
- July 29 – Elisabetta Caminèr Turra, Venetian writer (d. 1796)
- July 30 – Maria Anna Mozart ("Nannerl"), Austrian musician and composer, sister of Wolfgang Amadeus Mozart (d. 1829)
- September 1 – Emanuel Schikaneder, German dramatist, actor and singer (d. 1812)
- September 5 – François Joseph Westermann, French Revolutionary leader, general (d. 1794)
- October 30 – Richard Brinsley Sheridan, Irish dramatist, politician (d. 1816)
- date unknown
  - Charlotta Richardy, Swedish industrialist (d. 1831)
  - Thomas Sheraton, English furniture designer (d. 1806)

1752

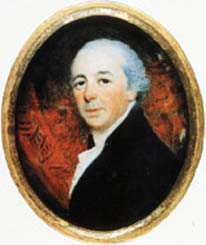
John Nash

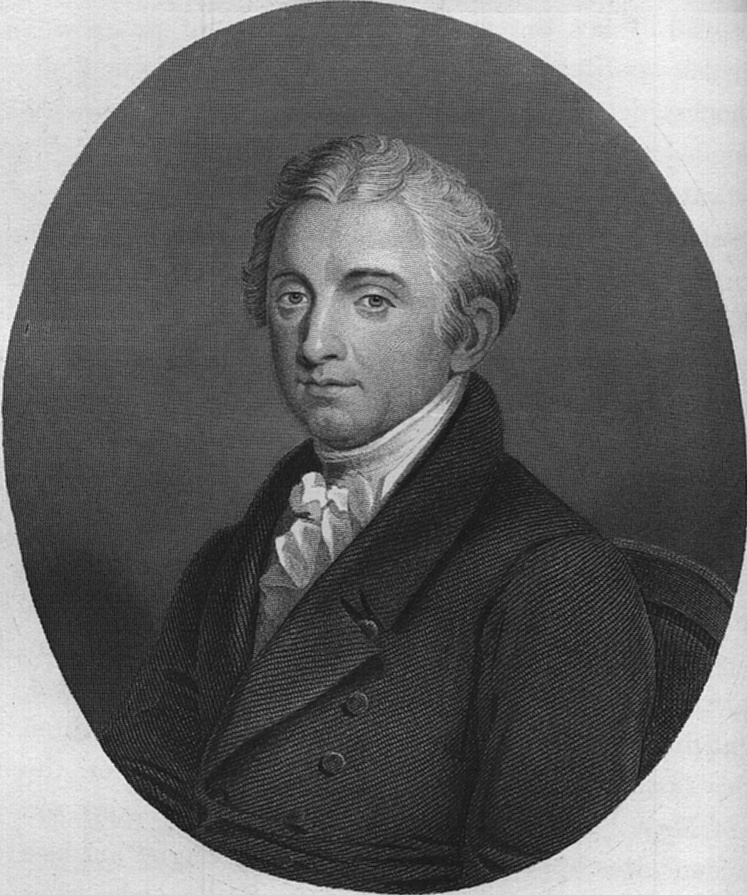
Gouverneur Morris

- January 1 – Betsy Ross, American entrepreneur, creator of the American flag (d. 1836)
- January 2
  - Nicholas Owen, Welsh Anglican priest, antiquarian (d. 1811)
  - Philip Morin Freneau, American poet (d. 1832)
- January 3 – Johannes von Müller, Swiss historian (d. 1809)
- January 4
- January 6 – Pierre Bouchet, French physician (d. 1794)
- January 10 – Laurent Jean François Truguet, French admiral (d. 1839)
- January 13
  - Eleonora Fonseca Pimentel, Italian poet and revolutionary (d. 1799)
  - Sir Philip Anstruther-Paterson, 3rd Baronet, Scottish politician (d. 1808)
- January 16
  - Nicolas-François Guillard, French librettist (d. 1814)
- January 17
  - George Baylor, officer in the American Continental Army (d. 1784)
- January 18
  - Alexander Kurakin, Russian diplomat (d. 1818)
  - John Nash, English architect (d. 1835)
  - Francesco Caracciolo, Neapolitan admiral, revolutionist (d. 1799)
  - Alexander Lindsay, 6th Earl of Balcarres, British Army general (d. 1825)
  - Louis Dufresne, French ornithologist, taxidermist (d. 1832)
- January 19 – James Morris III, Continental Army officer from Connecticut (d. 1820)
- January 20 – Jean-Baptiste Radet, French playwright (d. 1830)
- January 22
  - Robert Smith, 1st Baron Carrington (d. 1838)
- January 24 – Muzio Clementi, Italian composer, pianist (d. 1832)
- January 29
  - Pierre Martin, French Navy officer, admiral (d. 1820)
  - John Macleod, British Army general (d. 1833)
- January 31 – Gouverneur Morris, American diplomat, politician (d. 1815)

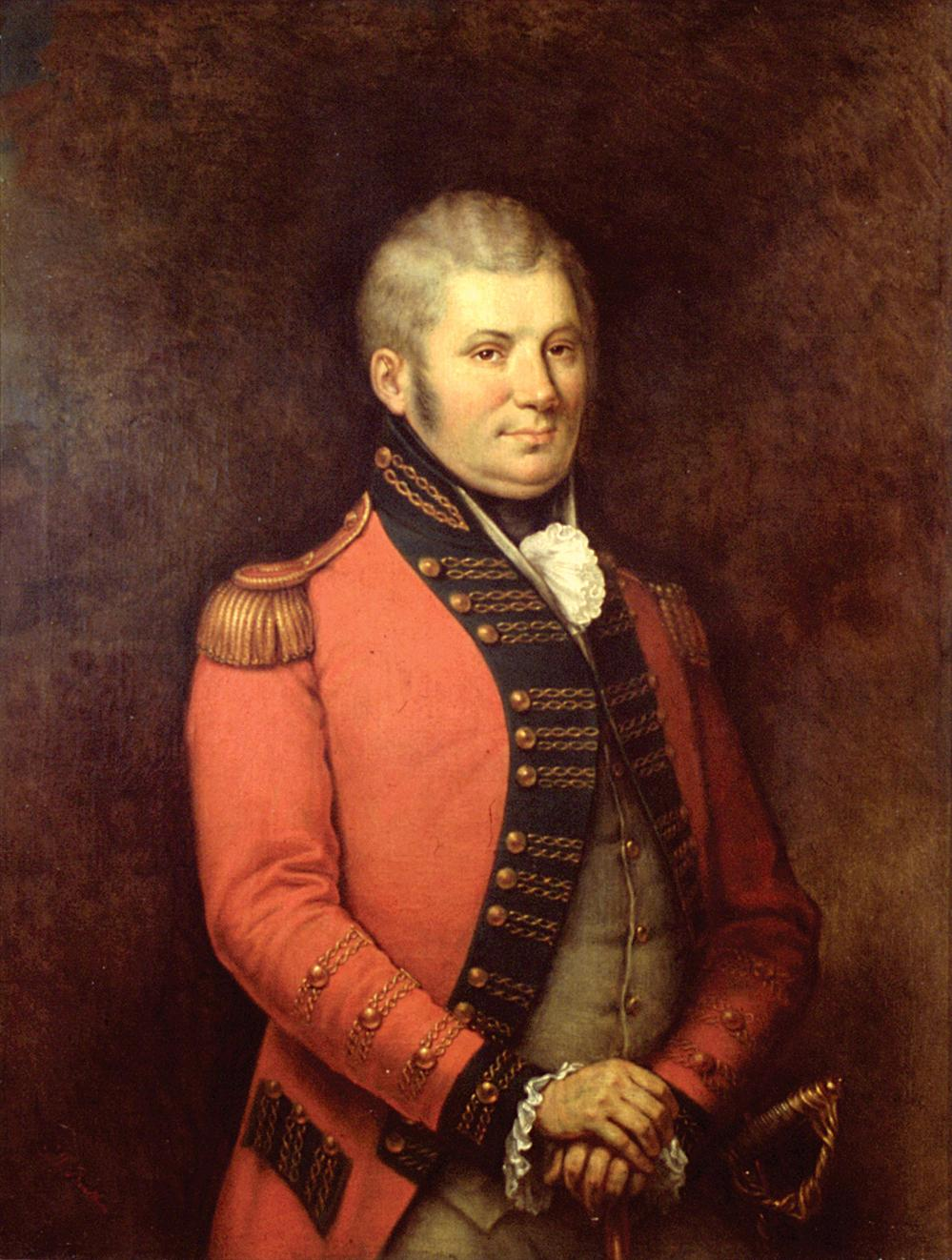
John Graves Simcoe

- February 4 – Gerrit Paape, Dutch politician, writer (d. 1803)
- February 5
  - Anton Walter, Austrian piano maker (d. 1826)
- February 8 – Victurnien-Jean-Baptiste de Rochechouart de Mortemart, French general, politician (d. 1812)
- February 9
  - Ebenezer Sproat, Continental Army officer, pioneer to the Ohio Country (d. 1805)
- February 12
  - Josef Reicha (d. 1795)
  - Dorothea Ackermann, German actress (d. 1821)
- February 13
  - Luise von Göchhausen, German lady in waiting (d. 1807)
  - Giovanni Fabbroni, Italian scientist (d. 1822)
- February 16 – Friedrich Karl Wilhelm, Fürst zu Hohenlohe, Austrian general (d. 1814)
- February 17 – Friedrich Maximilian Klinger, German writer (d. 1831)
- February 19 – Francesco Ruspoli, 3rd Prince of Cerveteri (d. 1829)
- February 19 – Simone Assemani, Italian orientalist (d. 1821)
- February 23 – Simon Knéfacz, Croatian writer (d. 1819)
- February 26 – James Winchester, American general and politician (d. 1826)
- February 27 – William Linn, American President of Queen's College) (d. 1808)
- March 3 – Thomas Hardy (political reformer) (d. 1832)
- March 5 – Leendert Viervant the Younger, Dutch architect (d. 1801)
- March 8
  - Johann David Schoepff, German biologist (d. 1800)
  - Robert Clifford, English cricketer (d. 1811)
- March 11
  - Sir Charles Hastings, 1st Baronet, British Army officer (d. 1823)
  - Joseph Malboeuf, dit Beausoleil, Member of Legislative Assembly of Lower Canada (d. 1823)
- March 14
  - Claude-Jean Martin, French Navy officer (d. 1827)
  - Jean-François-Auguste Moulin, member of the French Directory (d. 1810)
- March 16 – Antoine Joseph Santerre, French general (d. 1809)
- March 19 – Giuseppe Colucci, Italian historian of the Marche, writer (d. 1809)
- March 20 – Robert Newman, American sexton at the Old North Church in Boston (d. 1804)
- March 21
  - Maurice d'Elbée, French Royalist military officer (d. 1794)
  - Mary Dixon Kies, American inventor, first recipient of a U.S. patent (d. 1837)
- March 23 – Friedrich Wilhelm von Reden, German pioneer in mining and metallurgy (d. 1815)
- March 24 – Antoine Joseph Gorsas, French publicist, politician (d. 1793)
- March 25 – Carlos Fitz-James Stuart, 4th Duke of Liria and Jérica, Spanish duke (d. 1787)

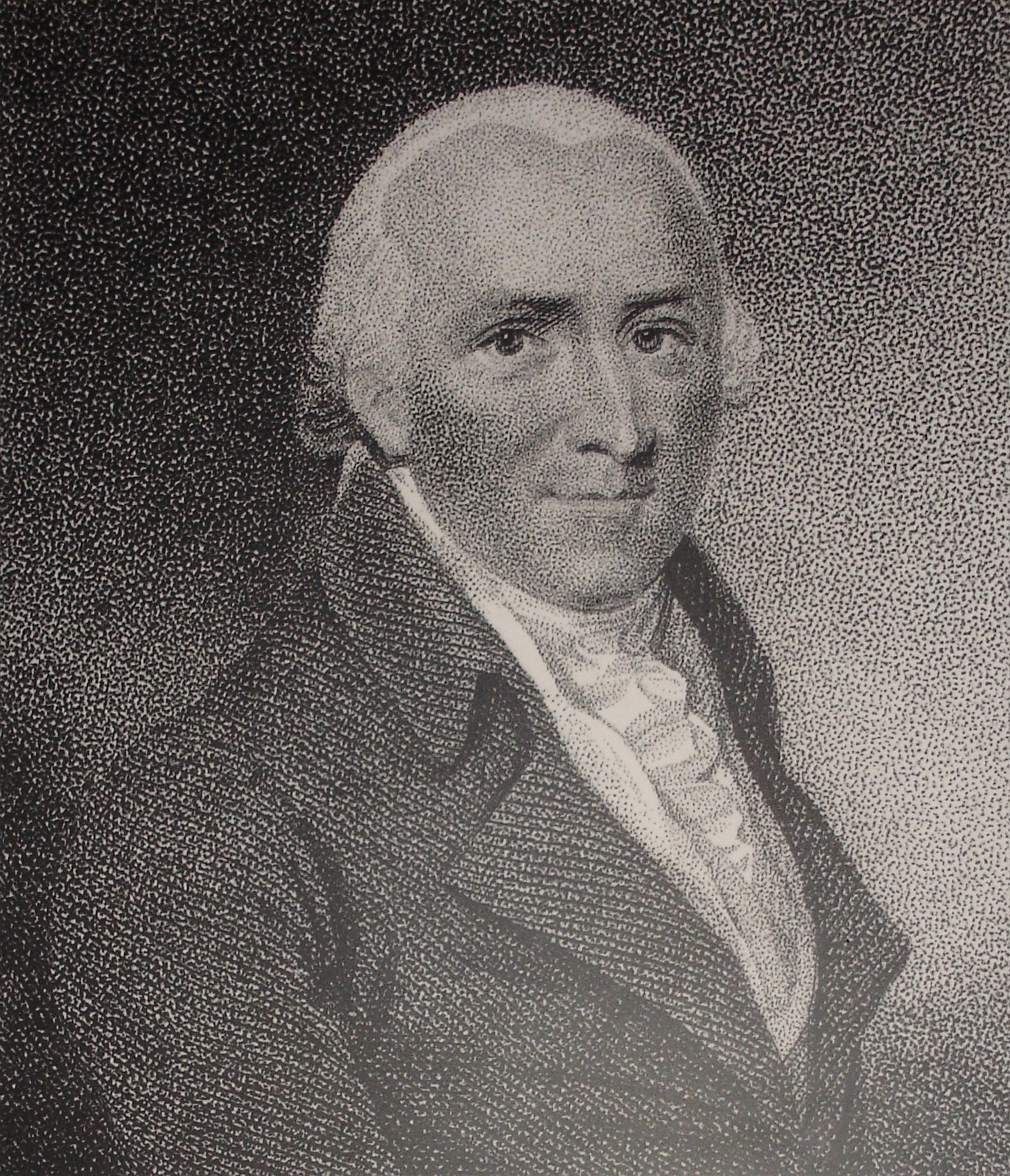
Humphry Repton

- April 4
  - Niccolò Antonio Zingarelli, Italian composer (d. 1837)
  - Jean-Pierre Saint-Ours, Swiss artist (d. 1809)
- April 5 – Sébastien Érard, German-born French instrument maker (d. 1831)
- April 6 – Meno Haas, German-born copperplate engraver (d. 1833)
- April 9 – Rudolph Zacharias Becker, German educator and author (d. 1822)
- April 17 – John Austin, Scottish inventor (d. 1830)
- April 18 – Sir Thomas Dyke Acland, 9th Baronet (d. 1794)
- April 19
  - John Henniker-Major, 2nd Baron Henniker, British politician (d. 1821)
  - Friederike Brion, first great love of Johann Wolfgang Goethe (d. 1813)
- April 21
  - Pierre-Alexandre-Laurent Forfait, French engineer (d. 1807)
  - Humphry Repton, English garden designer (d. 1818)
- April 23 – John Willett Payne, British Royal Navy admiral (d. 1803)
- April 28 – Matsumura Goshun, Japanese artist (d. 1811)
- May 4
  - John Brooks (governor), Massachusetts doctor, military officer, governor (d. 1825)
  - François Adriaan van der Kemp, Dutch politician (d. 1829)
- May 5 – Johann Tobias Mayer, German physicist (d. 1830)
- May 9 – Johann Anton Leisewitz, German lawyer and dramatic poet (d. 1806)
- May 9 – Antonio Scarpa, Italian anatomist (d. 1832)
- May 10
  - Amalie of Zweibrücken-Birkenfeld, First Queen of Saxony/Duchess of Warsaw (d. 1828)
  - Pierre de Ruel, marquis de Beurnonville, French general (d. 1821)
- May 11 – Johann Friedrich Blumenbach, German anthropologist (d. 1840)
- May 13 – Michael Hughes, Welsh industrialist (d. 1825)

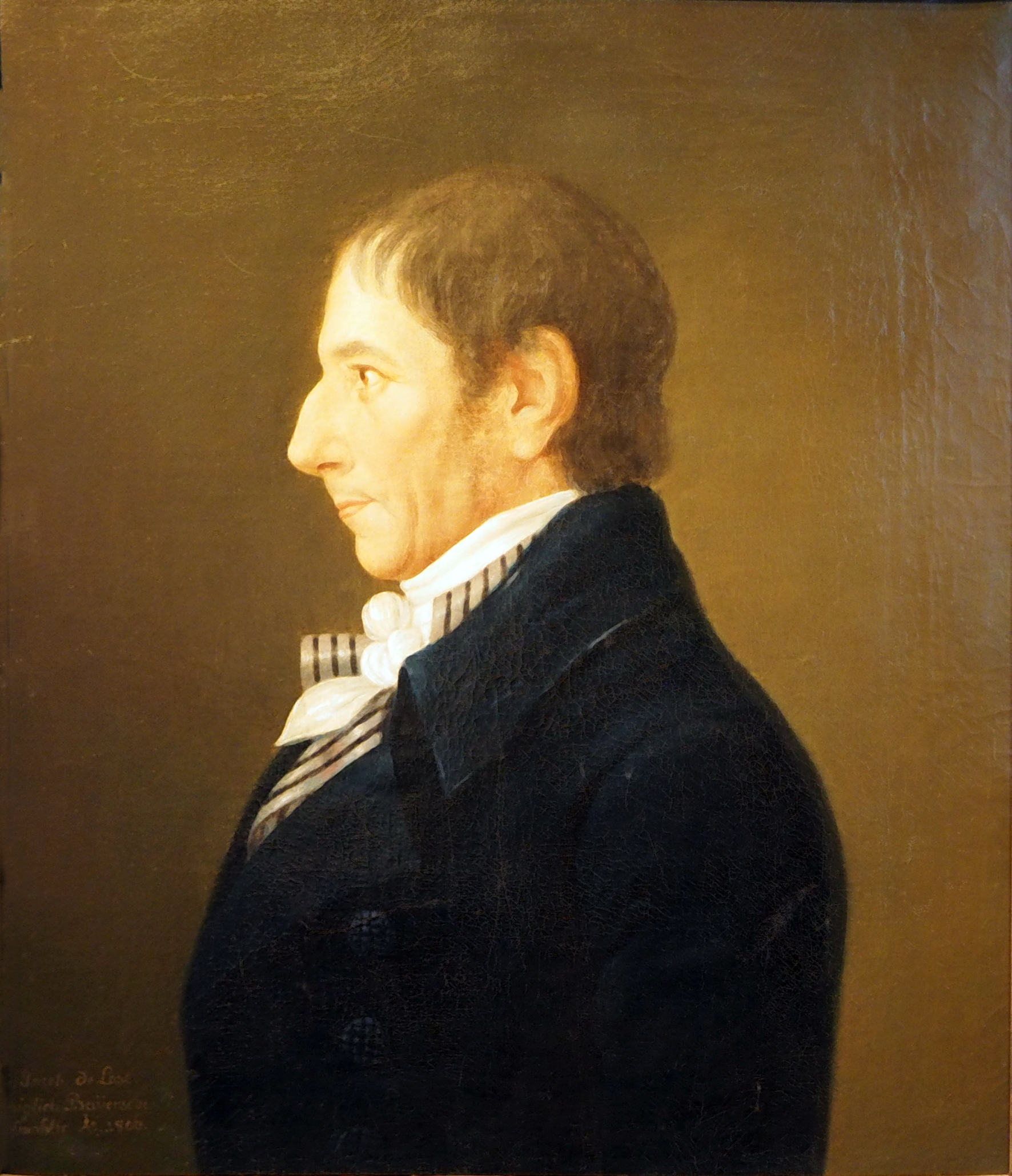
Albrecht Thaer

- May 14
  - Albrecht Thaer, German agronomist (d. 1828)
  - Timothy Dwight IV, American academic, educator (d. 1817)
  - Juliane Reichardt, German-born Bohemian pianist, singer and composer (d. 1783)
- May 17 – Thomas Boude, American politician (d. 1822)
- May 20
  - Charles-Louis Antiboul, French Girondist politician (d. 1793)
- May 22 – Louis Legendre, French politician of the Revolution period (d. 1797)
- May 24
  - Oliver Cromwell, African-American soldier (d. 1853)
- May 26
  - Antoine Brice, Belgian painter (d. 1817)
  - William Badger, master shipbuilder operating in Kittery, Maine (d. 1830)
- May 28 – Robert Carr Brackenbury, English Methodist preacher (d. 1818)
- May 29 – Charles Whitworth, 1st Earl Whitworth, British diplomat (d. 1825)
- May 31 – John Marsh, English music composer (d. 1828)
- June 5
  - George Burder, English Nonconformist divine (d. 1832)
  - Hardy Murfree, American soldier (d. 1809)
- June 6 – John Gabriel Jones, Kentucky pioneer and statesman (d. 1776)
- June 8 – Sir James Lamb, 1st Baronet of England (d. 1824)
- June 11
  - Christian Graf von Haugwitz, German statesman (d. 1832)
  - Eliphalet Pearson, American educator (d. 1826)

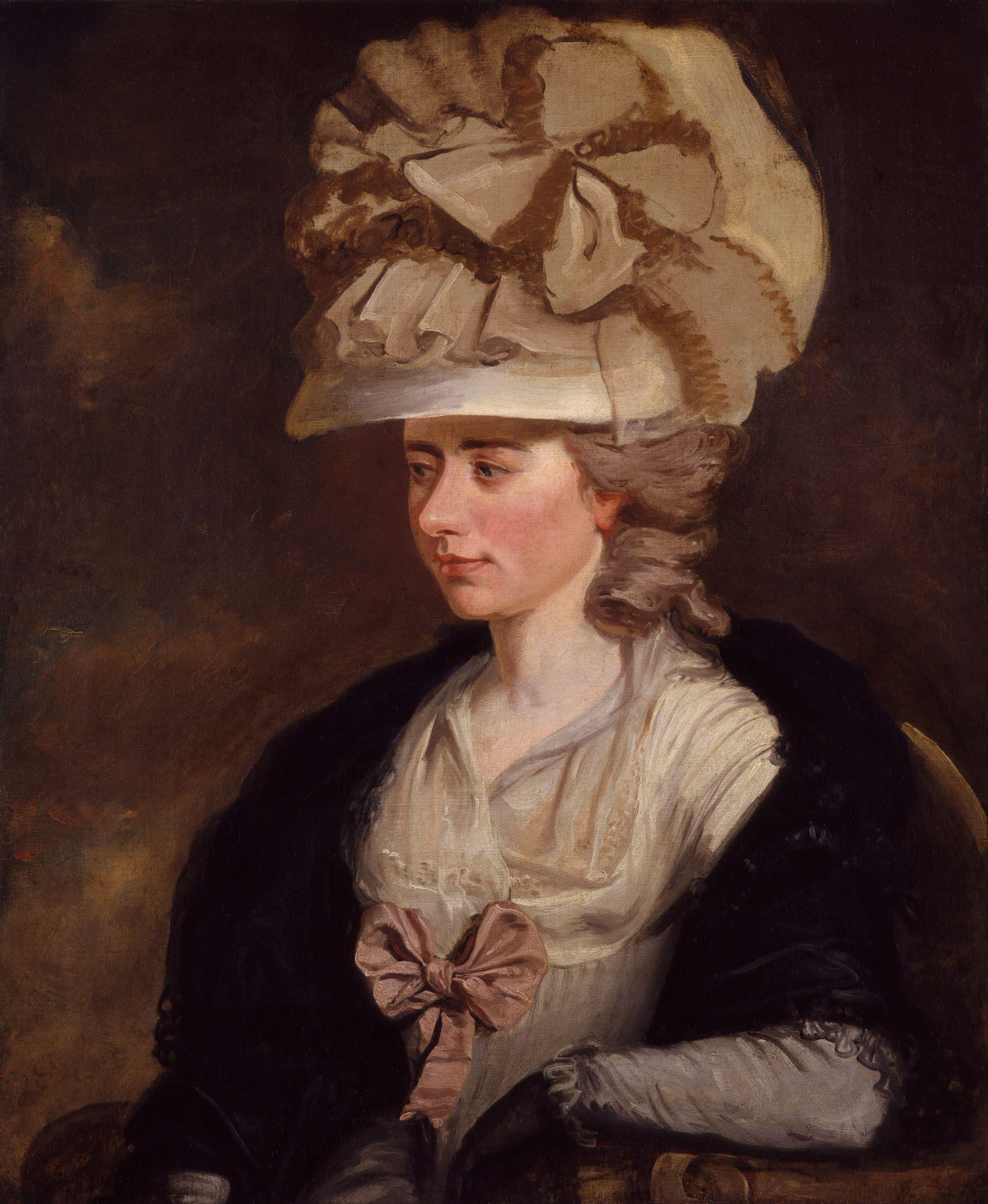
Frances Burney

- June 13 – Fanny Burney, English novelist, diarist (d. 1840)
- June 15 – Paul Cobb Methuen, British politician (d. 1816)
- June 19 – Lord Richard Cavendish (1752–1781), second son of William Cavendish (d. 1781)
- June 24 – Horatio Walpole, 2nd Earl of Orford (d. 1822)
- June 27 – Hannah Mather Crocker, American essayist, advocate of women's rights in America (d. 1829)
- June 29 – Christopher Frederik Lowzow, Danish-Norwegian army officer (d. 1829)
- July 1 – Thomas Pelham-Clinton, 3rd Duke of Newcastle, British Army general (d. 1795)
- July 3 – Heinrich Philipp Konrad Henke, German Lutheran theologian (d. 1809)
- July 4 – Ignace-Michel-Louis-Antoine d'Irumberry de Salaberry, Canadian politician (d. 1828)
- July 5
  - Luke Hansard, English printer (d. 1828)
- July 7 – Joseph Marie Jacquard, French inventor (d. 1834)
- July 8 – Morton Eden, 1st Baron Henley, British diplomat (d. 1830)

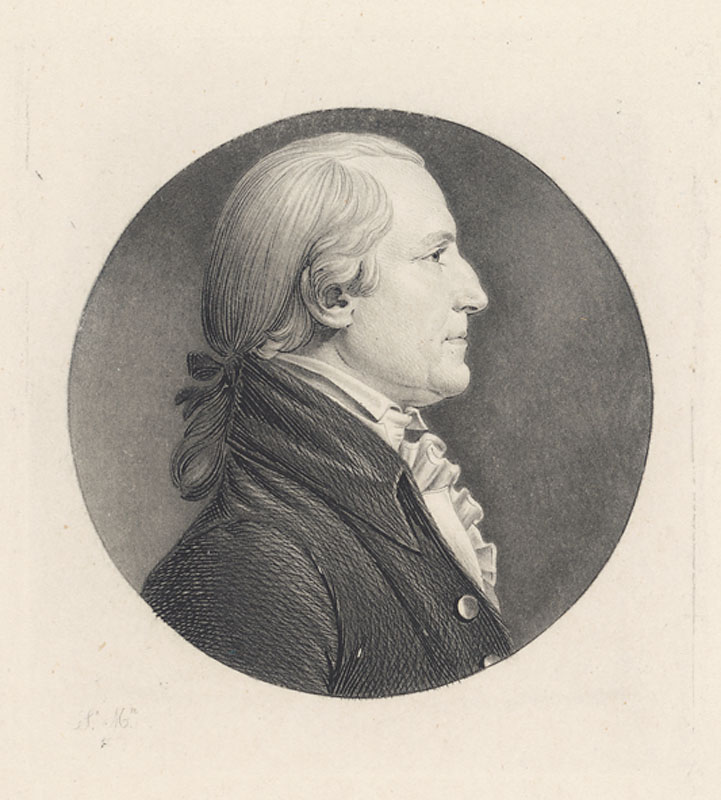
St. George Tucker

- July 10
  - David Humphreys, American diplomat (d. 1818)
- July 14 – Andreas Joseph Hofmann, German philosopher and revolutionary (d. 1849)
- July 17 – Barnaba Oriani, Italian priest (d. 1832)
- July 20 – Guillaume-Jean-Noël de Lavillegris, French Navy officer (d. 1807)
- July 23 – Marc-Auguste Pictet, Swiss physicist (d. 1825)
- July 27 – Samuel Smith (Maryland politician), American politician (d. 1839)
- July 29 – John Manners-Sutton, British politician (d. 1826)
- July 30 – Valentine Quin, 1st Earl of Dunraven and Mount-Earl, Irish politician (d. 1824)

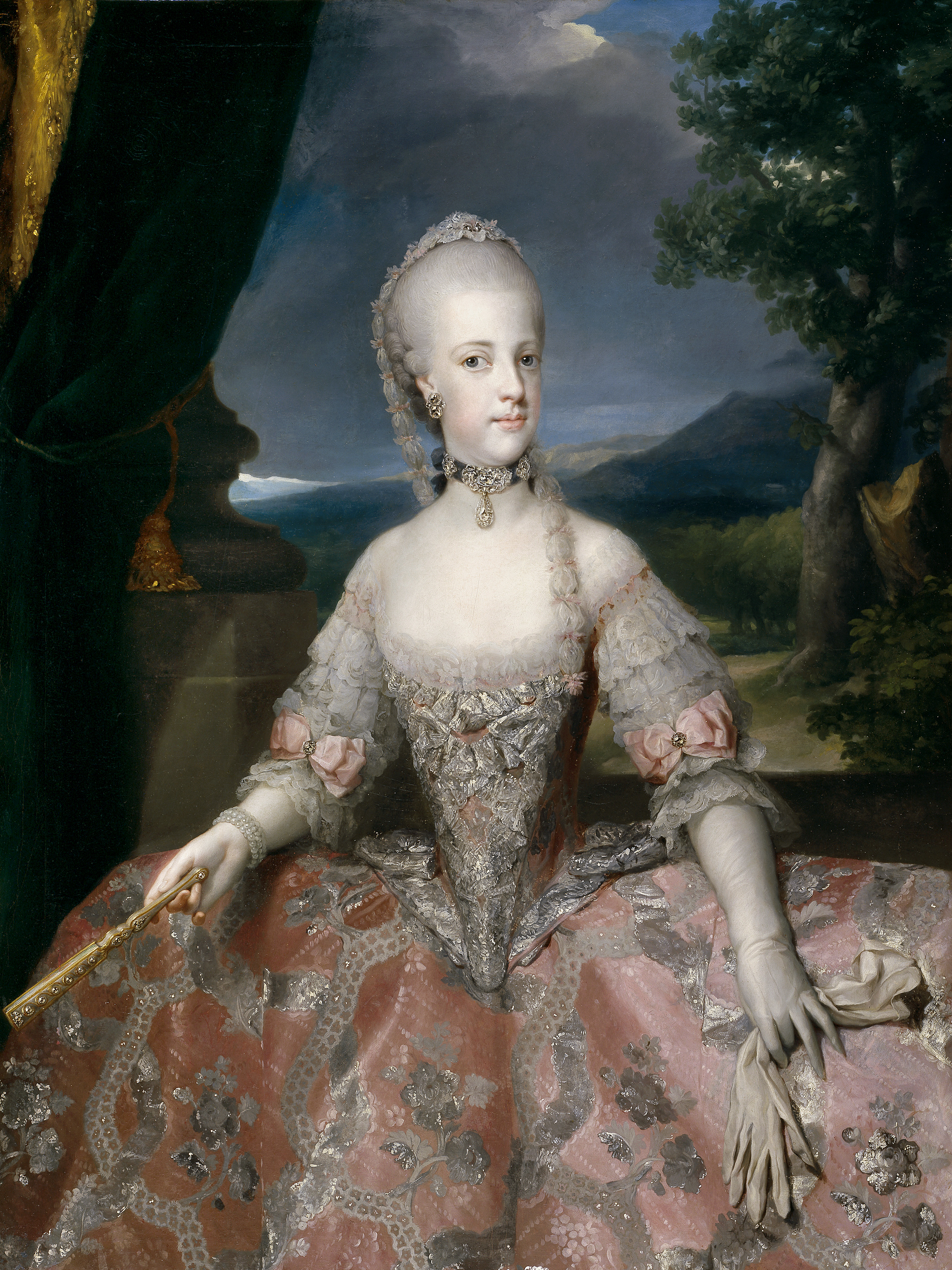
Maria Carolina of Austria

- August 6 – Princess Louise of Saxe-Meiningen, Landgravine of Hesse-Philippsthal-Barchfeld (d. 1805)
- August 13 – Queen Marie Caroline of Naples and Sicily (d. 1814)
- August 19 – Herman Bultos, Belgian wine merchant and theatre director (d. 1801)
- August 21
  - Antonio Cavallucci, Italian painter (d. 1795)
  - Jacques Roux, French priest (d. 1794)
  - Michel Ange Bernard Mangourit, French diplomat (d. 1829)
- August 22 – Alexander Tormasov, Russian general (d. 1819)
- August 25
  - Lodovico Gallina, Italian painter (d. 1787)
  - Karl Mack von Leiberich, Austrian soldier (d. 1828)

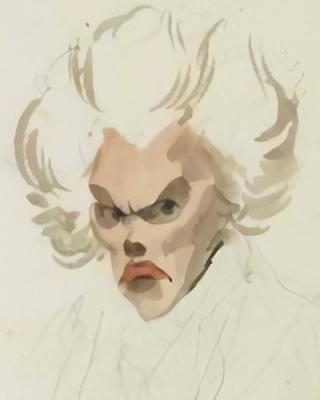
Adrien-Marie Legendre

- September 8 – Carl Stenborg, Swedish opera singer (d. 1813)
- September 18 – Adrien-Marie Legendre, French mathematician (d. 1833)
- September 21 – Antoine de Bosc de la Calmette, Danish statesman, landscape architect (d. 1803)
- September 22
  - James Bowdoin III, American philanthropist and statesman (d. 1811)
  - Ruler Jeongjo of Joseon (d. 1800)
- September 27
  - Marie-Gabriel-Florent-Auguste de Choiseul-Gouffier, French diplomat (d. 1817)
  - Nathaniel Curzon, 2nd Baron Scarsdale of Great Britain (d. 1837)
- September 28 – John the Painter, British criminal (d. 1777)
- September 30
  - Justin Heinrich Knecht, German composer, organist and music theorist (d. 1817)
  - William Adams, British politician (d. 1811)
- October 2
  - Samuel Story, Dutch admiral (d. 1811)
  - Joseph Ritson, English antiquary (d. 1803)
- October 6 – Jeanne-Louise-Henriette Campan, French educator, lady in waiting (d. 1822)
- October 13 – William Grant, British lawyer, politician and judge (d. 1832)
- October 16
  - Adolph Freiherr Knigge, German writer, Freemason (d. 1796)
  - Joseph Papineau, Canadian politician (d. 1841)
- October 17 – Jacob Broom, American businessman, politician (d. 1810)
- October 20 – Fabian Gottlieb von Osten-Sacken, Baltic-German field marshal (d. 1837)
- October 22 – Ambrogio Minoja, Italian composer, professor of music (d. 1825)
- October 23 – Maria Anna Adamberger, Austrian stage actress (d. 1804)
- October 28 – Jean Henri Simon, Belgian engraver, soldier (d. 1834)

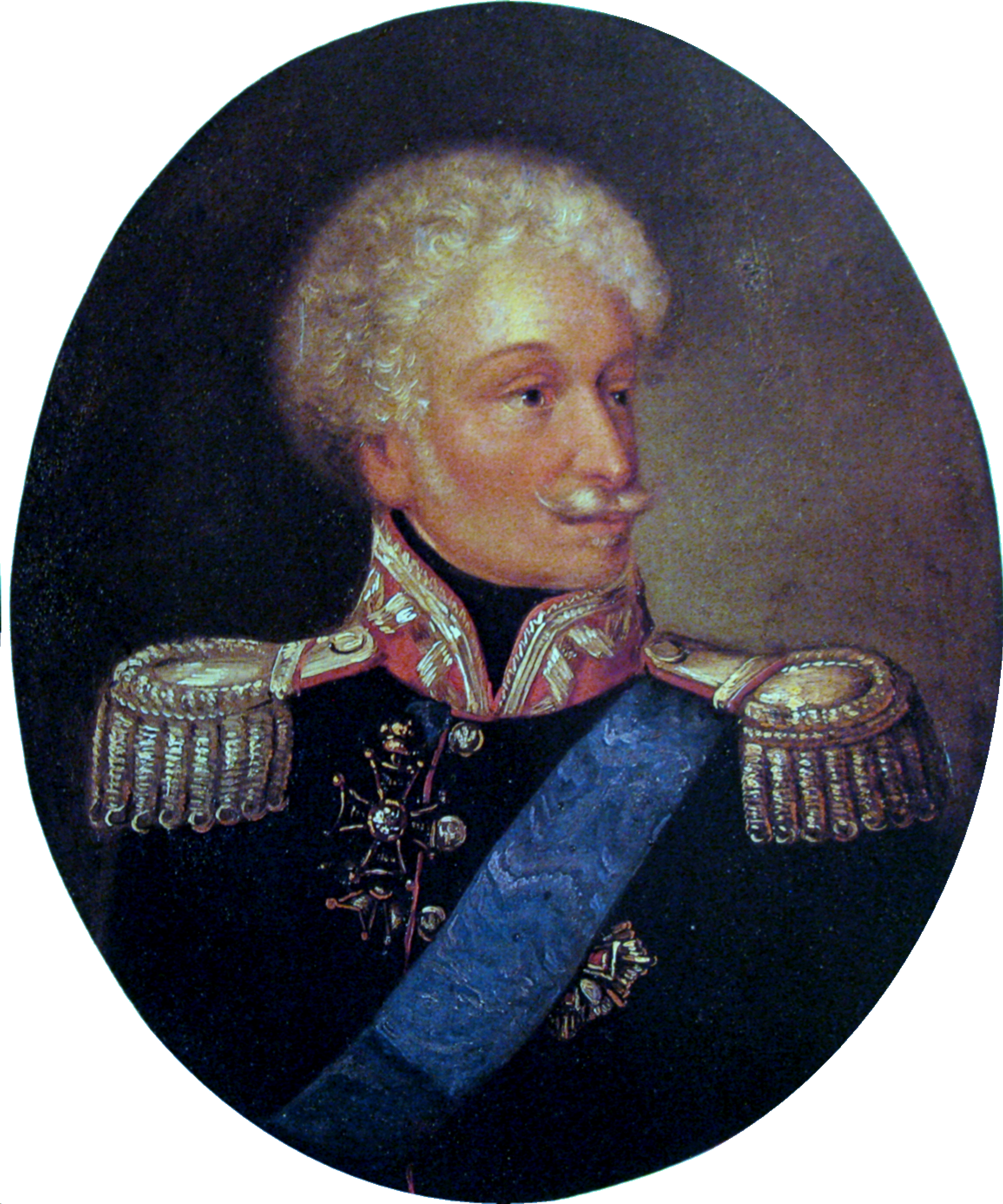
Józef Zajączek

- November 1 – Józef Zajączek, Polish general, politician (d. 1826)
- November 2
  - Andrey Razumovsky, Russian diplomat (d. 1836)
  - Thomas Carpenter, American glassmaker (d. 1847)
- November 4
  - George Finch, 9th Earl of Winchilsea, English cricketer (d. 1826)
  - Jean-Gérard Lacuée, count of Cessac (d. 1841)
- November 5
  - Jens Holmboe, Norwegian bailiff (d. 1804)
  - Richard Richards (judge), British politician (d. 1823)
- November 8 – Claude-Augustin Tercier, French general (d. 1823)
- November 11 – John McMillan, Presbyterian minister, missionary in Pennsylvania (d. 1833)
- November 17 – Caspar Voght, German businessman (d. 1839)
- November 18 – P. H. Frimann, Norwegian-Danish poet (d. 1839)

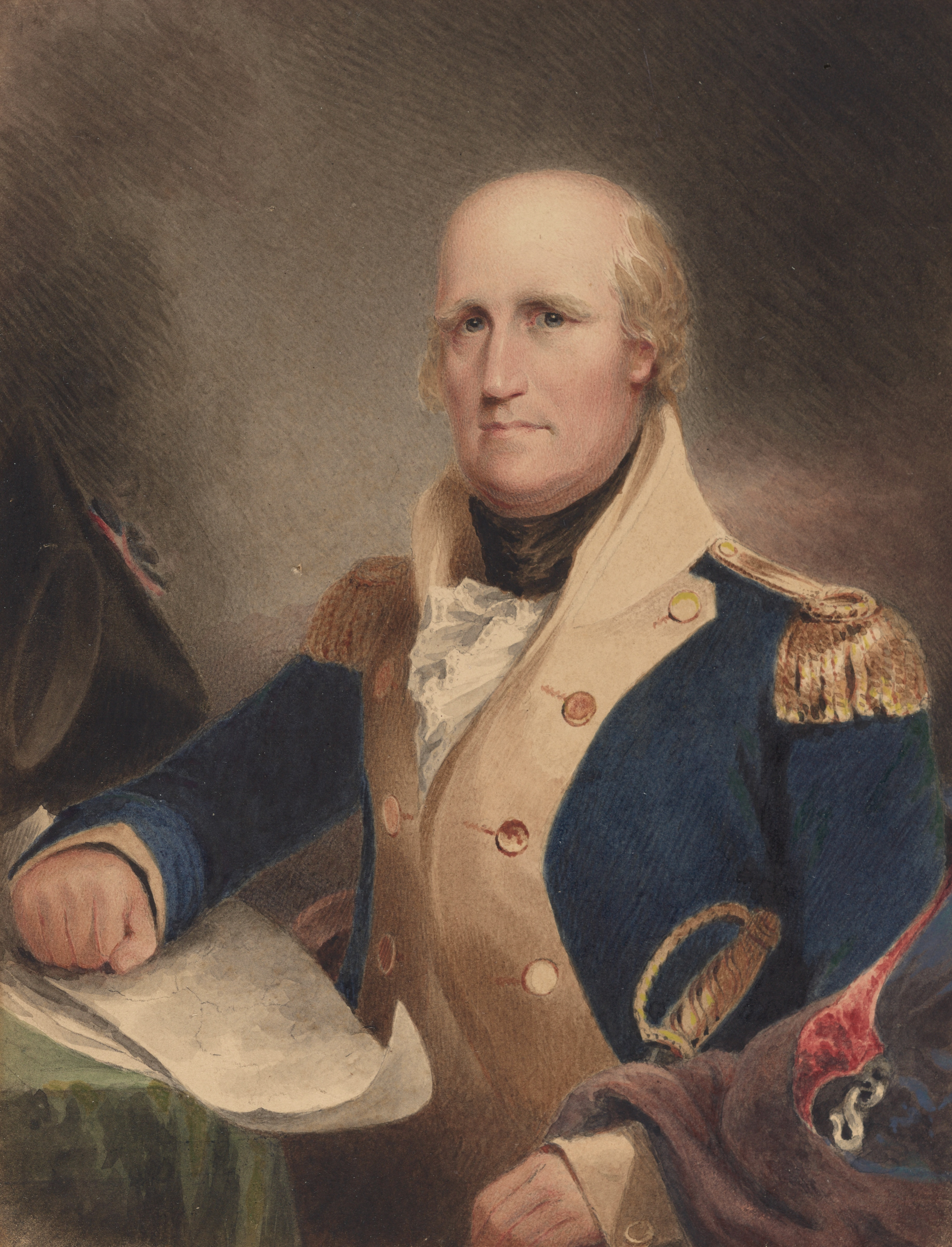
George Rogers Clark

- November 19 – George Rogers Clark, American soldier, officer and explorer (d. 1818)

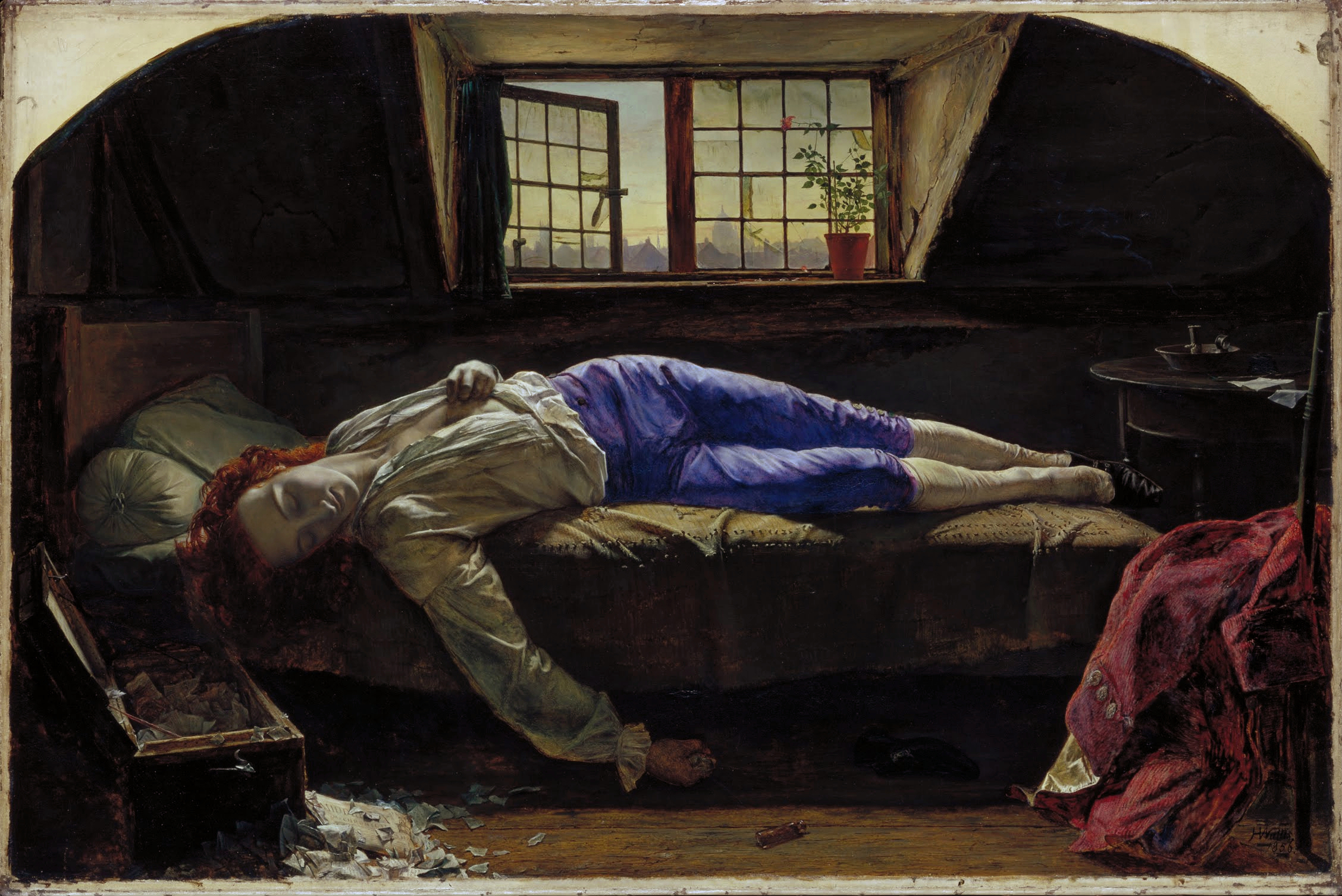
Thomas Chatterton

- November 20
  - Thomas Chatterton, English poet (d. 1770)
- November 21 – George Pozer, German-born British merchant (d. 1848)
- November 23 – Maksimilijan Vrhovac, Croatian Catholic bishop (d. 1827)
- November 25 – Johann Friedrich Reichardt, German composer (d. 1814)
- November 29 – Philippe-André Grandidier, French priest, historian (d. 1787)
- November 29 – Jemima Wilkinson, American preacher (d. 1819)

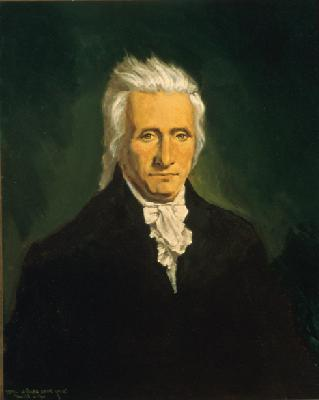
Gabriel Duvall

- December 3 – Leonard Gyllenhaal, Swedish military officer, entomologist (d. 1840)
- December 6
  - Robert de Lamanon, French botanist (d. 1787)
- December 8
  - Sir John Barrington, 9th Baronet of Great Britain (d. 1818)
  - Placidus a Spescha, Swiss mountain climber (d. 1833)
  - Vicesimus Knox, English essayist, minister (d. 1821)
- December 9 – Antoine Étienne de Tousard, French general, military engineer (d. 1813)
- December 12
  - Thomas Bulkeley, 7th Viscount Bulkeley, English aristocrat and politician (d. 1822)
  - Pedro Andrés del Alcázar, Spanish and later Chilean Army officer and war hero (d. 1820)
- December 14 – Christoph August Tiedge, German poet (d. 1841)
- December 17 – John Kilby Smith, American Continental army officer (d. 1842)
- December 19 – François Isaac de Rivaz, French inventor, politician (d. 1828)
- December 21 – Jean-François Houbigant, French perfumer (d. 1807)
- December 28 – Conrad Tanner, Swiss abbot (d. 1825)
- December 30 – Sir Charles Malet, 1st Baronet, British East India Company official (d. 1815)

1753

- February 12 – François-Paul Brueys d'Aigalliers, French admiral (d. 1798)
- March 8 – William Roscoe, English writer (d. 1831)
- March 9 – Jean-Baptiste Kléber, French general (d. 1800)
- March 26 – Benjamin Thompson, American physicist and inventor (d. 1814)
- April 3 – Simon Willard, American horologist (d. 1848)
- April 28– Franz Karl Achard, German chemist, physicist and biologist (d. 1821)
- May 13 – Lazare Carnot, French general, politician and mathematician (d. 1823)
- June 5 – Johann Friedrich August Göttling, German chemist (d. 1809)
- July 9 – William Waldegrave, 1st Baron Radstock, British admiral, Governor of Newfoundland (d. 1825)
- c. August 11 – Thomas Bewick, English wood engraver (d. 1828)

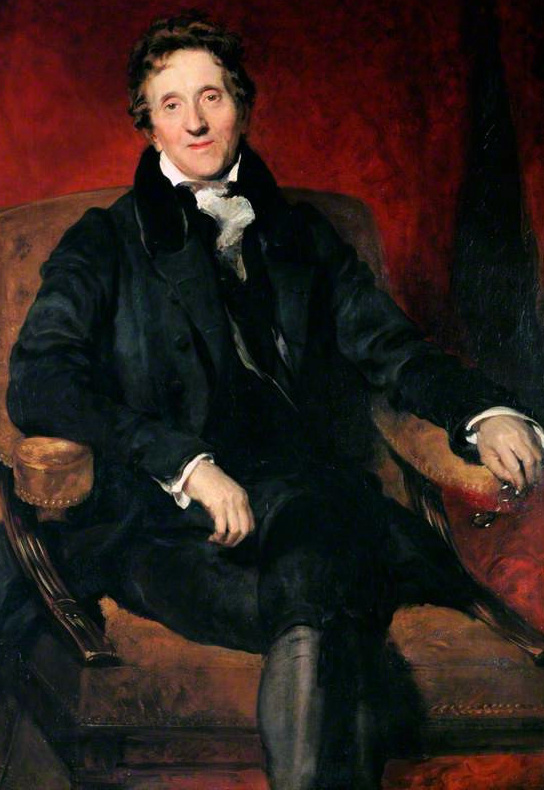
John Soane

- September 10 – John Soane, English architect (d. 1837)
- October 27 – Jean-Baptiste de Lavalette, French general (d. 1794)
- November 6 – Jean-Baptiste Breval, French composer (d. 1823)
- November 20 – Louis-Alexandre Berthier, French marshal (d. 1815)
- November 25 – Robert Townsend, member of the Culper Spy Ring (d. 1838)
- December 3 – Samuel Crompton, English inventor (d. 1827)
- date unknown
  - Francesc Antoni de la Dueña y Cisneros, Spanish bishop (d. 1821)
  - John Haggin, "Indian fighter", one of the earliest settlers of Kentucky (d. 1825)
  - Quang Trung, Vietnamese emperor (d. 1792)
  - Phillis Wheatley, African-born American poet (d. 1784)

1754

- January 15
  - Richard Martin, Irish founder of the Society for the Prevention of Cruelty to Animals (d. 1834)
  - Jacques Pierre Brissot, French politician (d. 1795)
- January 30 – John Lansing Jr., American statesman (disappeared 1829)
- February 2 – Charles Maurice de Talleyrand-Périgord, French politician (d. 1838)
- February 6 – Andrew Fuller, Particular Baptist Theologian and minister (d. 1815)
- February 17 – Nicolas Baudin, French explorer (d. 1803)
- March 4 – Benjamin Waterhouse, American physician, medical professor (smallpox vaccine pioneer) (d. 1846)
- March 17 – Madame Roland (Jeanne Marie Manon Philipon), French politician (d. 1793)
- March 23 – Baron Jurij Vega, Slovenian mathematician, physicist and artillery officer (d. 1802)
- April 6 – Frédéric-César de La Harpe, Swiss politician and revolutionary

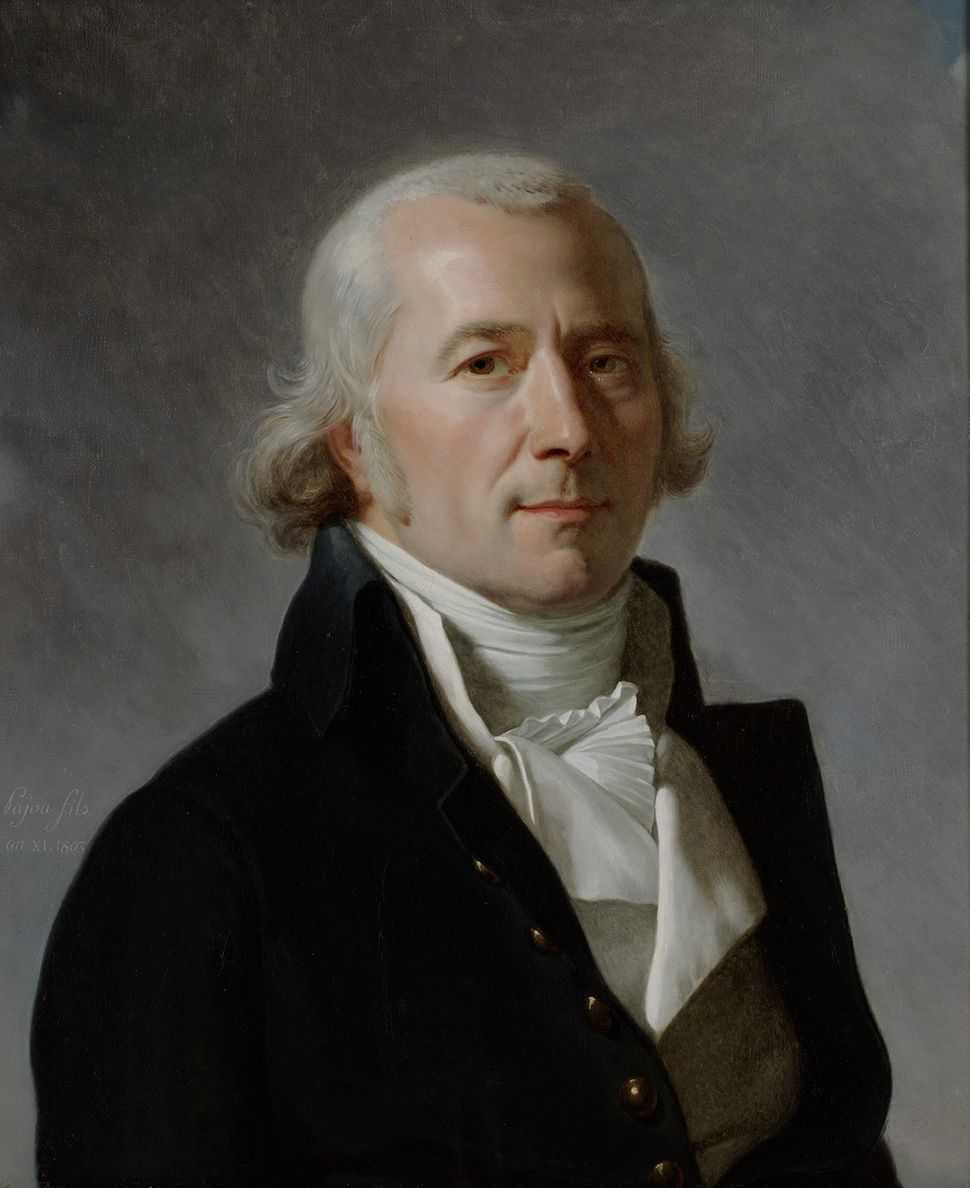
Frédéric-César de La Harpe

- May 23 – William Drennan, Irish physician, poet and radical politician (d. 1820)
- May 31 – Catherine-Dominique de Pérignon, Marshal of France (d. 1818)
- June 4 – Franz Xaver von Zach, German scientific editor and astronomer (d. 1832)
- June 18 – Anna Maria Lenngren, Swedish poet, feminist and cultural figure (d. 1817)
- July 11 – Thomas Bowdler, English physician (d. 1825)
- August 9 – Pierre Charles L'Enfant, French architect (d. 1825)
- August 18 – François, marquis de Chasseloup-Laubat, French general (d. 1833)
- August 21 – William Murdoch, Scottish inventor (d. 1839)

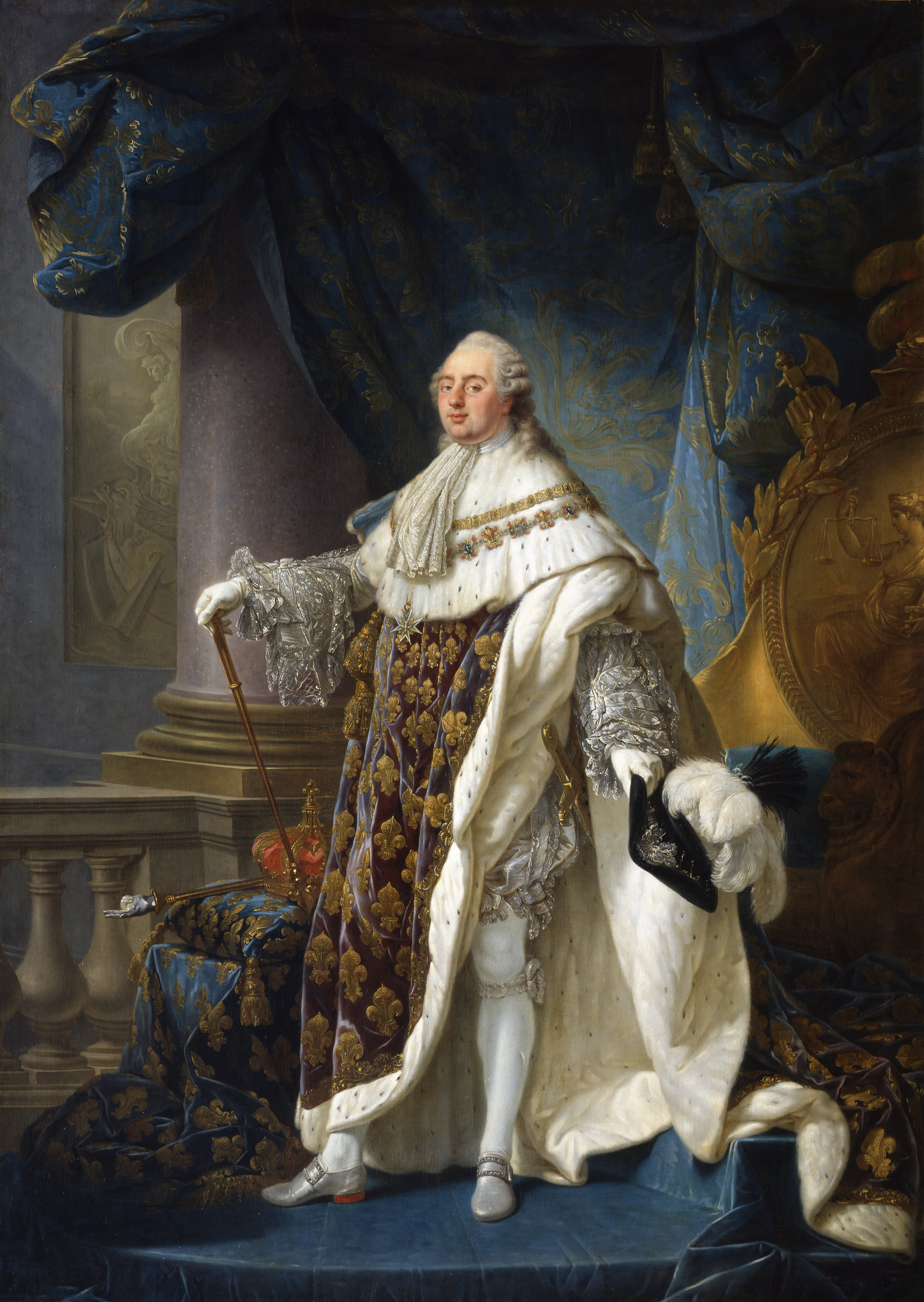
Louis XVI

- August 23 – Louis XVI, last king of France before the Revolution (d. 1793)
- September 9 – William Bligh, British sailor (d. 1817)
- September 20 – Emperor Paul I of Russia (d. 1801)
- September 26 – Joseph Proust, French chemist (d. 1826)
- October 9 – Jean-Baptiste Regnault, French painter (d. 1829)
- October 20 – James Hillhouse, American politician and congressman from Connecticut, 1791 until 1810 (d. 1832)
- October 28 – John Laurens, American soldier (d. 1782)
- November 19 – Pedro Romero, Spanish torero (d. 1839)
- December 7 – Jack Jouett, American politician (d. 1822)
- December 9 – Étienne Ozi, French composer (d. 1813)
- December 15 – Usman dan Fodio, Nigerian Islamic theologian (d. 1817)
- December 24 – George Crabbe, English poet (d. 1832)
- Eve Frank, Bulgarian religious leader (d. 1816)
- Richard Hancorne, British Royal Navy officer (d. 1792)

1755

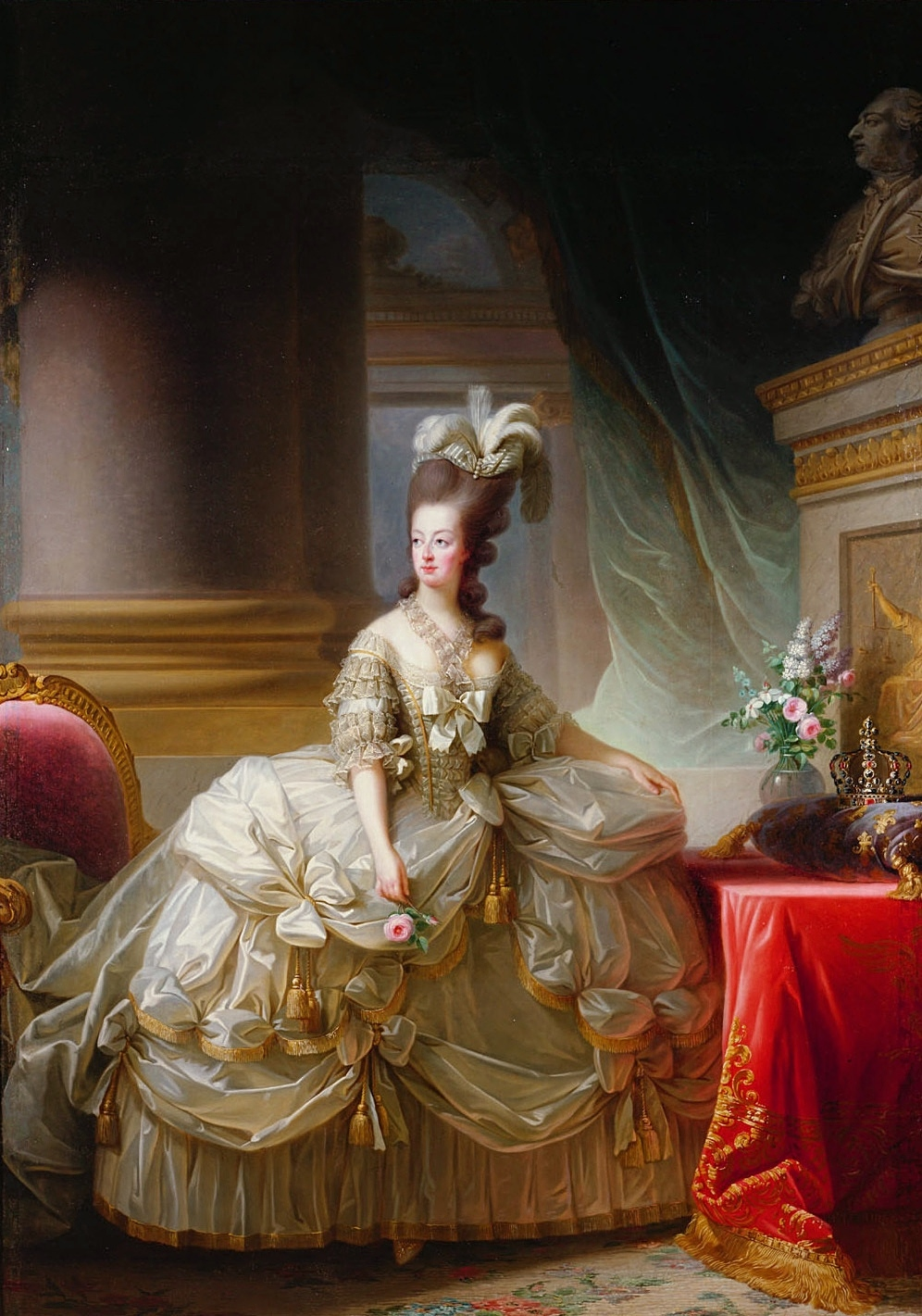
Marie Antoinette

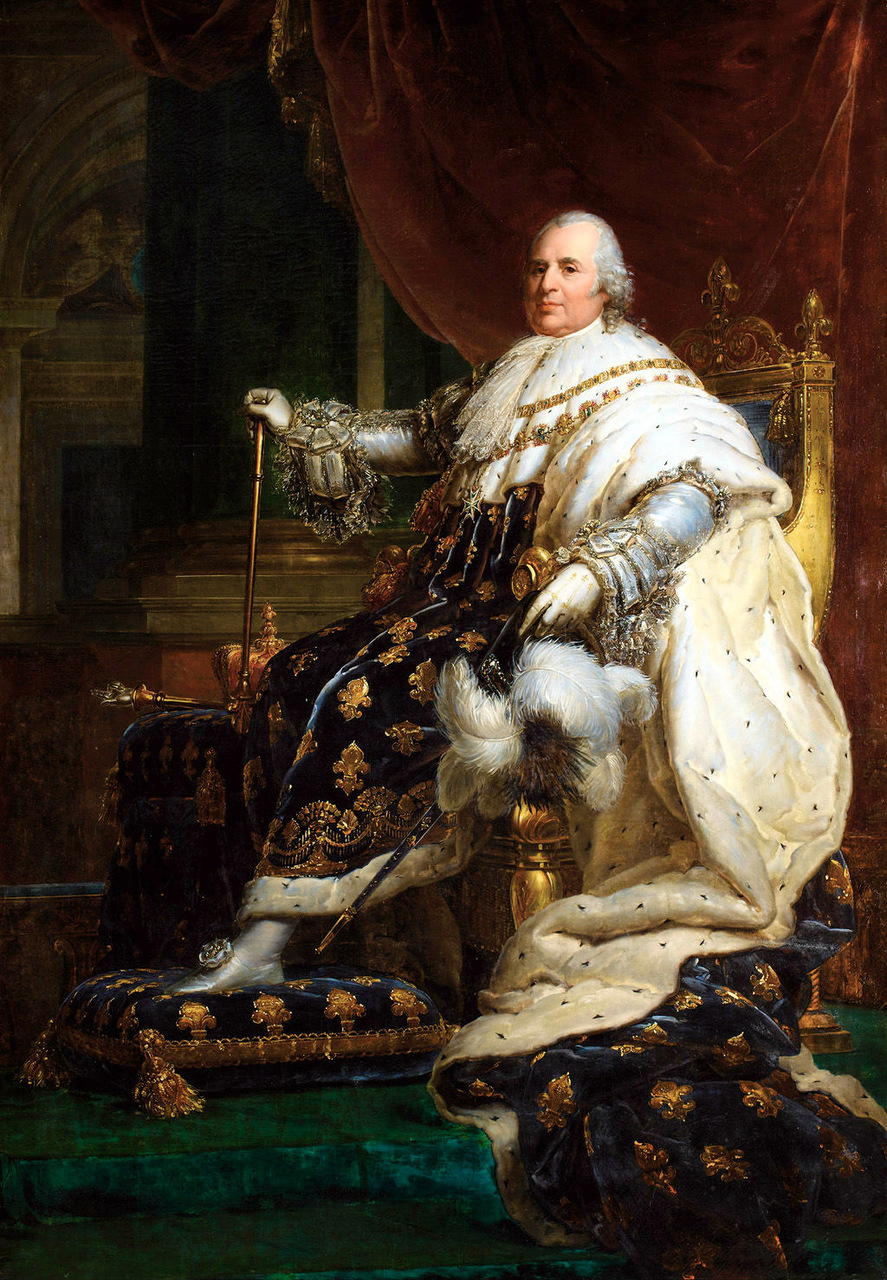
Louis XVIII

- January 25 – Paolo Mascagni, Italian anatomist (d. 1815)
- January 28 – Samuel Thomas von Sömmerring, German physician, anatomist (d. 1830)
- February 2 – Uriah Tracy, American politician and congressman from Connecticut, 1793 until 1807 (d. 1807)
- February 5 – Caroline Müller, Danish operatic mezzo-soprano, actress and dancer (d. 1826)
- February 11 – Albert Christoph Dies, German composer (d. 1822)
- February 21 – Anne Grant, Scottish poet (d. 1838)
- March 24 – Rufus King, American lawyer, politician and diplomat (d. 1827)
- April 3 – Simon Kenton, American frontiersman, Revolutionary Militia General (d. 1836)
- April 10 – Samuel Hahnemann, German founder of homeopathy (d. 1843)
- April 11 – James Parkinson, English surgeon, apothecary, geologist, palaeontologist and political activist (d. 1824)
- April 16 – Louise Élisabeth Vigée Le Brun, French painter (d. 1842)
- June 6 – Nathan Hale, American Revolutionary War captain, writer and patriot (d. 1776)
- June 15 – Antoine François, comte de Fourcroy, French chemist (d. 1809)
- June 30 – Paul Barras, French politician (d. 1829)
- September 9 – Benjamin Bourne, American politician (d. 1808)
- September 13 – Oliver Evans, American inventor, engineer and businessman (d. 1819)
- October 2 – Hannah Adams, American author (d. 1831)
- November 1 – Henriette von Crayen, German salonnière (d. 1832)
- November 2 – Marie Antoinette, Queen Consort of France (d. 1793)
- November 12 – Gerhard von Scharnhorst, Prussian general (d. 1813)
- November 17
  - Louis XVIII of France, brother of King Louis XVI (d. 1824)
  - Charles Manners-Sutton, Archbishop of Canterbury (d. 1828)
- December 3 – Gilbert Stuart, American painter from Rhode Island (d. 1828)
- date unknown
  - Maria Elizabetha Jacson, British botanist (d. 1829)
  - Yelena Shidyanskaya, Russian commander (d. 1849)

1756

- January 19 – Guillaume-Antoine Olivier, French entomologist (d. 1814)

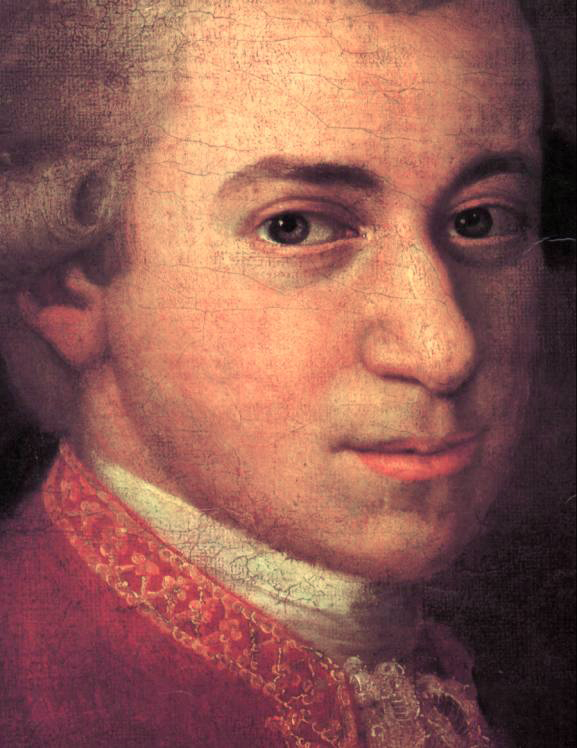
Wolfgang Amadeus Mozart

- January 27 – Wolfgang Amadeus Mozart, Austrian composer (d. 1791)
- February 6 - Aaron Burr, American politician (d. 1836)
- February 20 – Angelica Schuyler Church, American socialite, daughter of Genl.Philip Schuyler, sister to Elizabeth Schuyler Hamilton (d. 1814)
- March 3 – William Godwin, English writer (d. 1836)
- March 4 – Sir Henry Raeburn, Scottish painter (d. 1823)
- May 10 – Singu Min, king of Myanmar (k. 1782)
- May 18 – Ignaz Aurelius Fessler, Hungarian-born court councillor, minister to Czar Alexander I of Russia (d. 1839)
- May 27 – King Maximilian I Joseph of Bavaria (d. 1825)
- May 31 – Abbé Faria, Luso-Goan Catholic monk, student of hypnotism (d. 1819)
- June 6 – John Trumbull, American painter (d. 1843)
- June 20 – Joseph Martin Kraus, German-Swedish composer (d. 1792)
- July 7 – Gustaf Adolf Reuterholm, Swedish statesman (d. 1813)
- July 31 – Dheeran Chinnamalai, Tamil king (d. 1805)
- August 1 – Pierre Louis Prieur, French politician (d. 1827)
- August 29 – Heinrich Graf von Bellegarde, Austrian field marshal, statesman (d. 1845)
- September 7 – Willem Bilderdijk, Dutch author (d. 1831)
- September 13 – Benedikte Naubert, German writer (d. 1819)
- September 23 – John Loudon McAdam, Scottish engineer, road-builder (d. 1836)
- October 21 – Philippine Engelhard, German writer, scholar (d. 1831)
- November 3 – Pierre Laromiguière, French philosopher (d. 1837)
- December 7 – John Littlejohn, British-American sheriff and Methodist preacher (d. 1836)
- date unknown
  - Maria Pellegrina Amoretti, Italian lawyer (d. 1787)
  - Gideon Morris, trans-Appalachian pioneer (d. 1798)
  - Hilchen Sommerschild, Norwegian educator (d. 1831)

1757

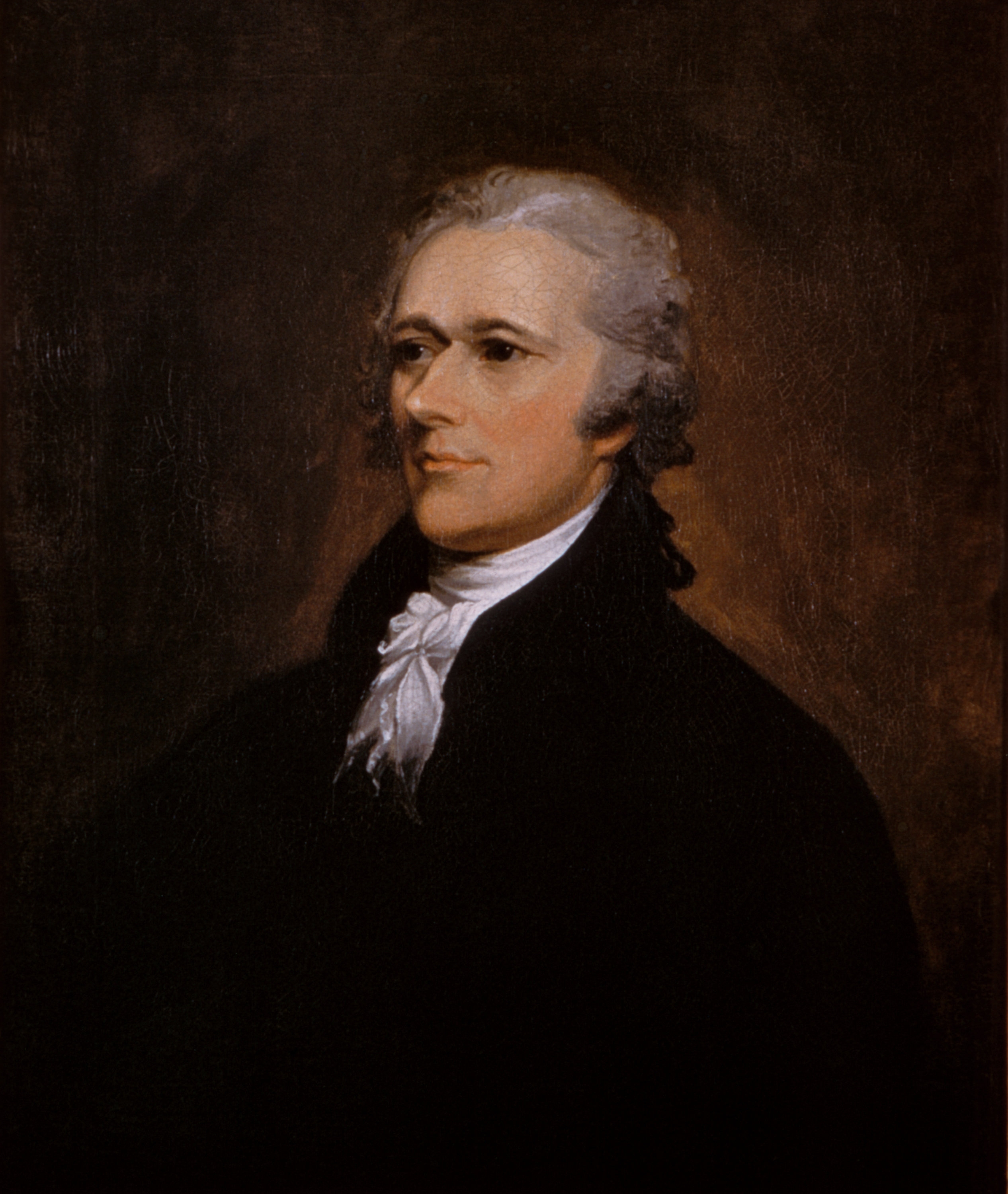
Alexander Hamilton

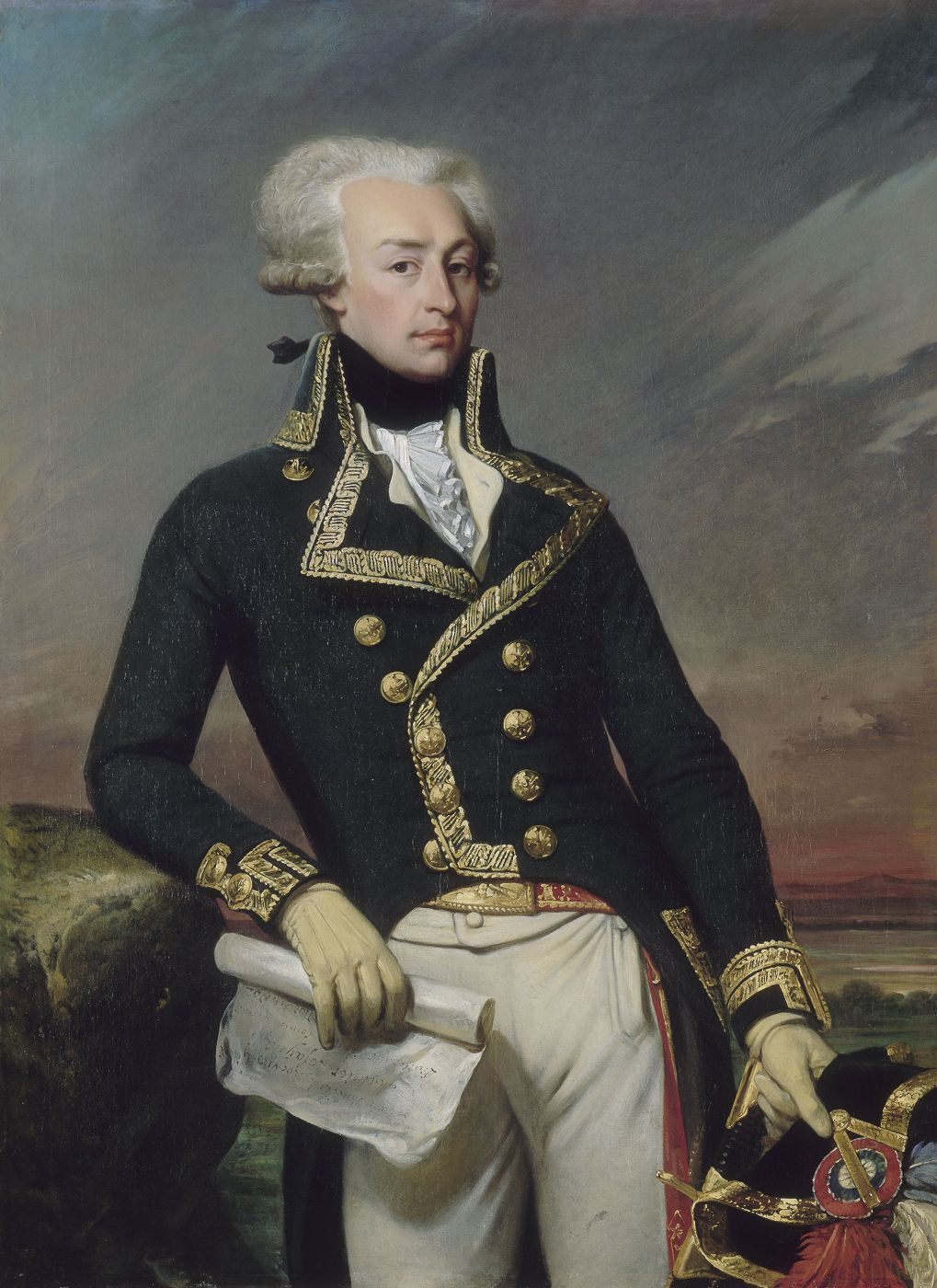
Gilbert du Motier, Marquis de Lafayette

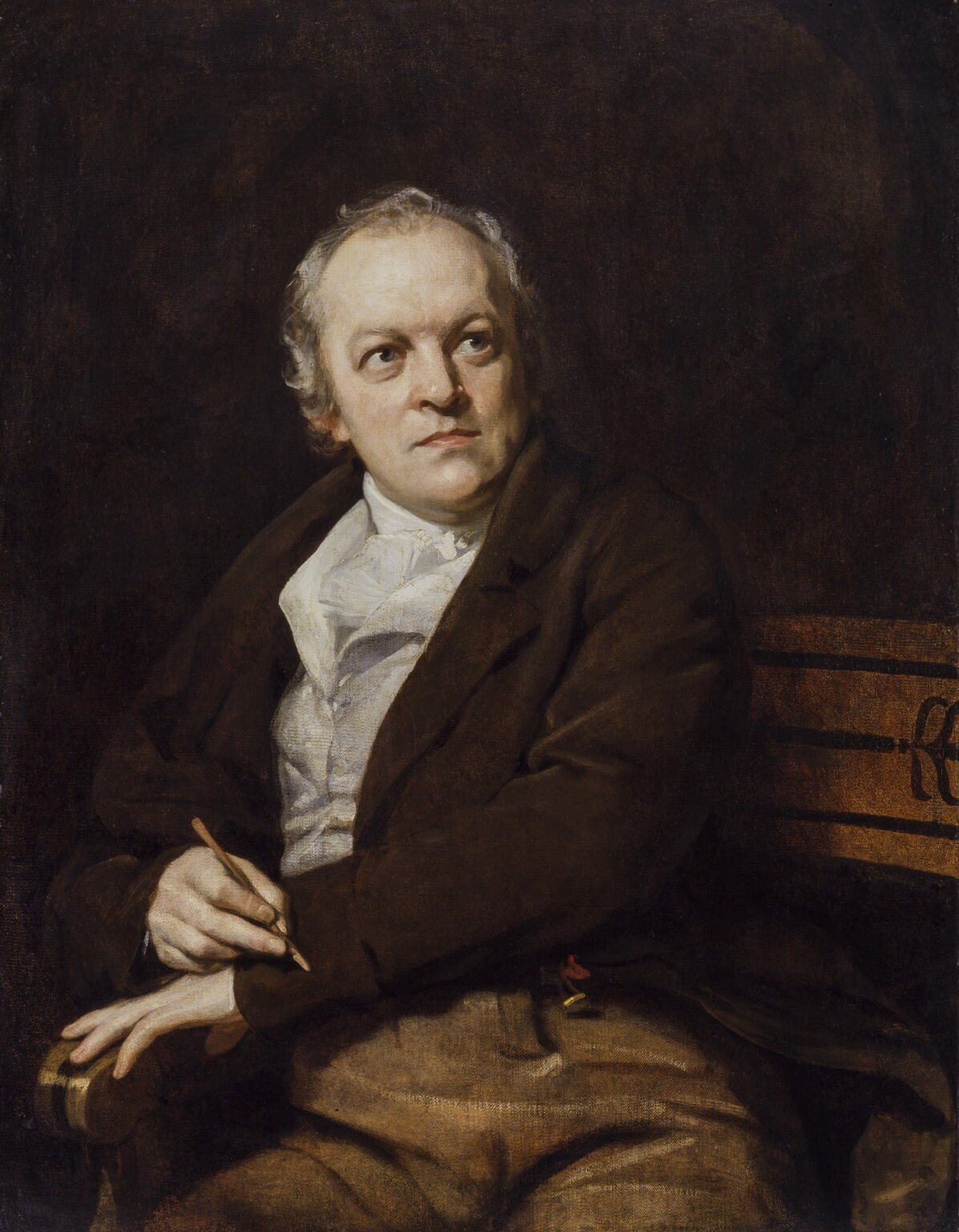
William Blake

- January 11 – Alexander Hamilton, first U.S. Secretary of the Treasury (most cited date of birth) (d. 1804)
- January 16 – Richard Goodwin Keats, British admiral, Governor of Newfoundland (d. 1834)
- February 3 – Joseph Forlenze, Italian ophthalmologist (d. 1833)
- February 20 – John 'Mad Jack' Fuller, English philanthropist (d. 1834)
- April 9 – Edward Pellew, 1st Viscount Exmouth, British admiral (d. 1833)
- April 28 – Edmund Butcher, English Unitarian minister (d. 1822)
- May 6 – Veronika Gut, Swiss rebel heroine (d. 1829)
- May 7 – Ludwig von Brauchitsch, Prussian general (d. 1827)
- May 25 – Louis-Sébastien Lenormand, French chemist, physicist and inventor (d. 1837)
- May 30 – Henry Addington, 1st Viscount Sidmouth, Prime Minister of the United Kingdom (d. 1844)
- June 18 – Gervasio Antonio de Posadas, Argentine leader (d. 1833)
- June 22 – George Vancouver, British explorer (d. 1798)
- July 20 – Garsevan Chavchavadze, Georgian diplomat, politician (d. 1811)
- August 9 – Elizabeth Schuyler, wife of Alexander Hamilton, co-founder of New York's first orphanage (d. 1854)
- August 9 – Thomas Telford, Scottish-born civil engineer, architect (d. 1834)
- August 23 – Marie Magdalene Charlotte Ackermann, German actress (d. 1775)
- September 6 – Gilbert du Motier, Marquis de Lafayette, French soldier, statesman (d. 1834)
- September 20 – Esther de Gélieu, Swiss educator (d. 1817)
- October 9 – King Charles X of France (d. 1836)
- October 21 – Charles-Pierre Augereau, Marshal of France and duc de Castiglione (d. 1816)
- November 1 – Antonio Canova, Italian sculptor (d. 1822)
- November 28 – William Blake, English poet and artist (d. 1827)
- December 7 – José Antonio Pareja, Spanish admiral (d. 1813)
- December 30 – Sebastián Kindelán y O'Regan, Spanish colonial governor (d. 1826)
- Date unknown
  - Agnes Ibbetson, English plant physiologist (d. 1823)
  - John Leamy, Irish–American merchant (d. 1839)

1758

- January 6 – Charles Ganilh, French economist, politician (d. 1836)
- January 9 – George Leveson-Gower, 1st Duke of Sutherland, born Viscount Trentham, British politician and landowner (d. 1833)
- January 11 – François Louis Bourdon, French Revolutionary politician (d. 1797)
- January 17 – Marie Anne Simonis, Belgian textile industrialist (d. 1831)
- January 20 – Marie-Anne Pierrette Paulze, French chemist (d. 1836)
- January 24 – Frederick Ponsonby, 3rd Earl of Bessborough (d. 1844)
- February 1 – David Ochterlony, Massachusetts-born general with the East India Company (d. 1825)
- February 3
  - Francis Napier, 8th Lord Napier of Great Britain (d. 1823)
  - Vasily Kapnist, Ukrainian poet, playwright (d. 1823)
- February 4 – George Thicknesse, 19th Baron Audley, English peer (d. 1818)
- February 10 – Amalia Holst, German writer, intellectual and feminist (d. 1829)
- February 17 – John Pinkerton, British antiquarian (d. 1826)
- February 28 – Nicolas François, Count Mollien, French financier (d. 1850)
- March 9 – Franz Joseph Gall, German pioneering neuroanatomist (d. 1828)
- March 12 – Leopold Karel, Count of Limburg Stirum (d. 1840)
- March 15 – Magdalene Sophie Buchholm, Norwegian poet (d. 1826)
- April 4
  - John Hoppner, English portrait-painter (d. 1810)
  - Pierre-Paul Prud'hon, French painter (d. 1823)
- April 16 – Christian Karl August Ludwig von Massenbach, Prussian soldier (d. 1827)
- April 22 – Francisco Javier Castaños, 1st Duke of Bailén, Spanish general (d. 1852)
- April 23
  - Alexander Hood, British Royal Navy officer (k. 1798)
  - Alexander Cochrane, British Royal Navy officer (d. 1832)
  - Philip Gidley King, British Royal Navy officer, colonial administrator (d. 1808)
- April 27 – Charles Dumont de Sainte-Croix, French zoologist (d. 1830)

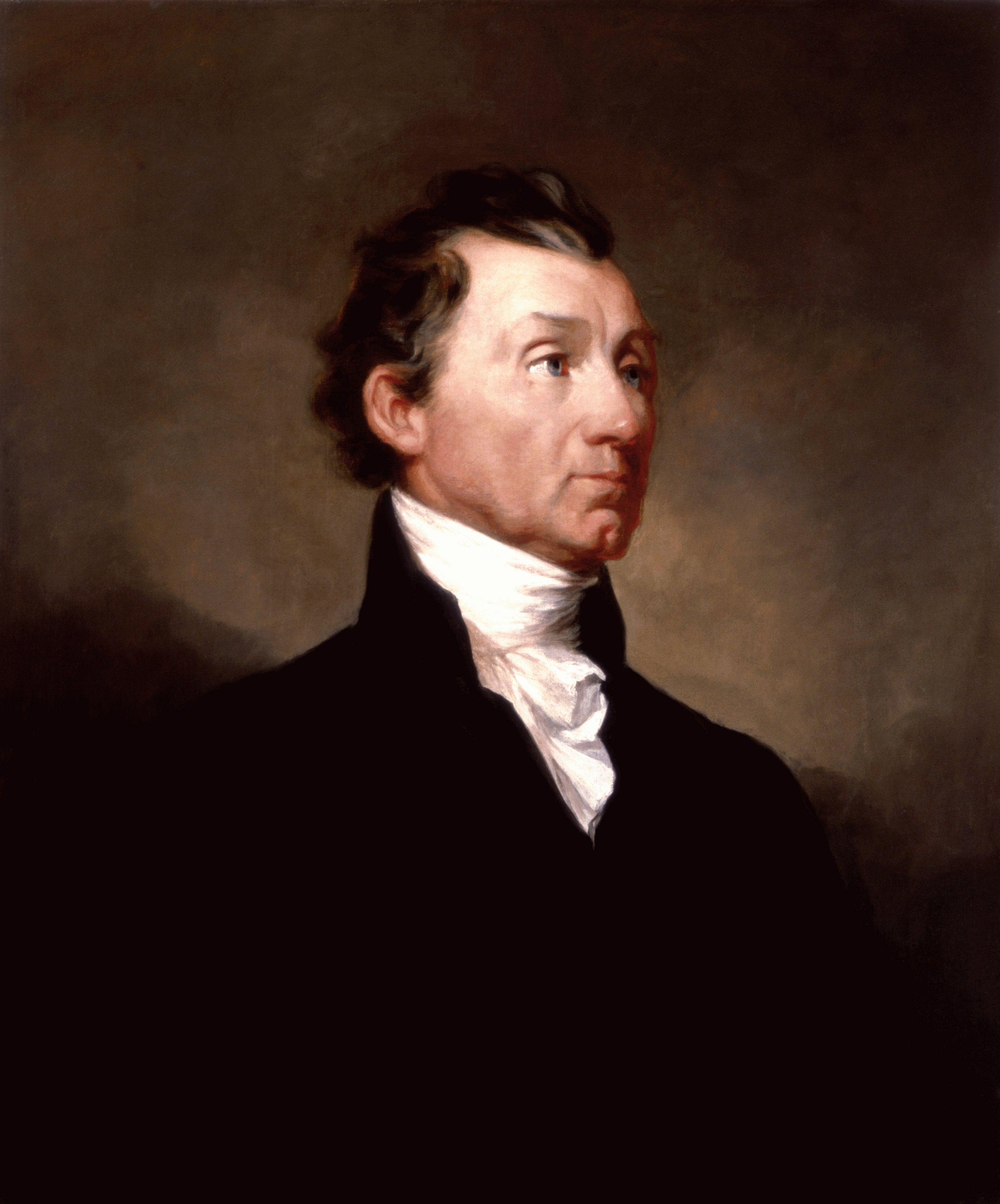
James Monroe

- April 28 – James Monroe, fifth President of the United States (d. 1831)
- April 29 – Georg Carl von Döbeln, Swedish officer, general and war hero (d. 1820)
- April 30
  - Emmanuel Vitale, Maltese military leader (d. 1802)
  - Jane West, English writer (d. 1852)

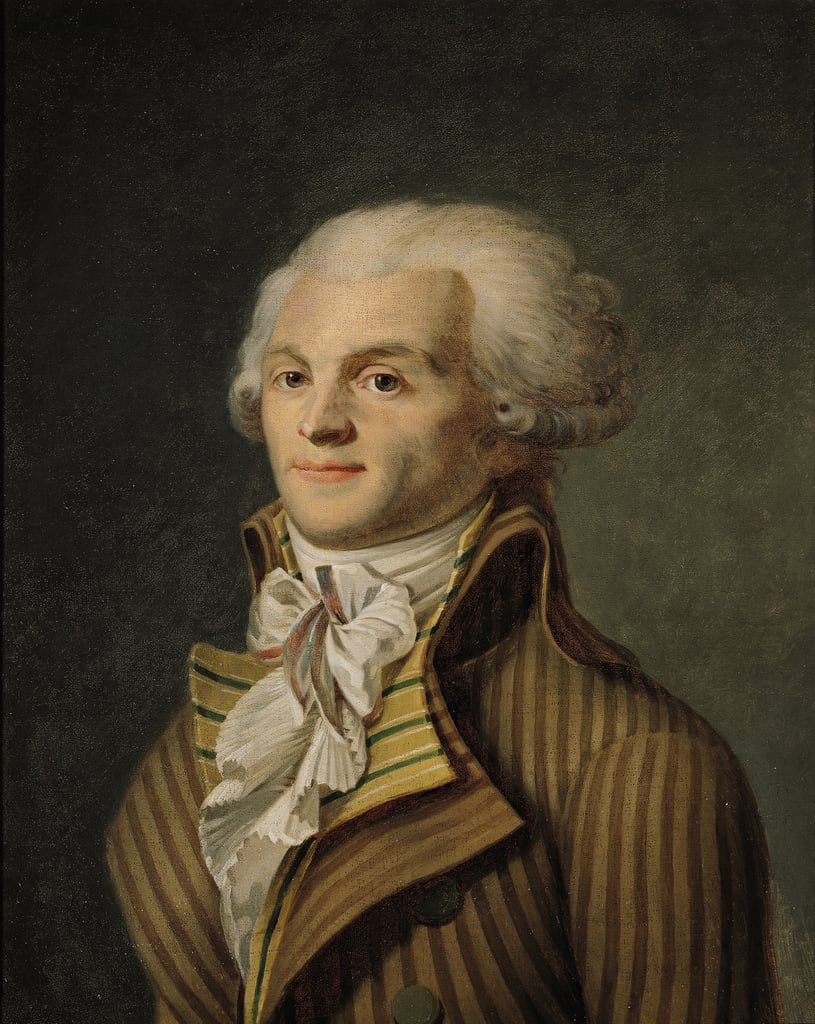
Maximilien Robespierre

- May 6
  - Maximilien de Robespierre, French revolutionary (d. 1794)
  - André Masséna, Napoleonic general, Marshal of France (d. 1817)
- May 8 – John Heath, U.S. Representative for Virginia (d. 1810)
- May 15 – Thomas Taylor, English neoplatonist translator (d. 1835)
- May 17
  - Sir John St Aubyn, 5th Baronet, English fossil collector (d. 1839)
  - Honoré IV, Prince of Monaco (d. 1819)
- June 19 – Raffaello Sanzio Morghen, Italian engraver (d. 1833)
- June 29 – Clotilde Tambroni, Italian philologist, linguist (d. 1817)
- July 25 – Elizabeth Hamilton, English writer (d. 1816)
- July 31 – Rosalie de Constant, Swiss naturalist (d. 1834)
- July 31 – Jeremiah Colegrove, U.S. farmer, manufacturer and soldier (d. 1836)
- August 5 – Emperor Go-Momozono of Japan (d. 1779)
- August 14 – Carle Vernet, French painter (d. 1835)

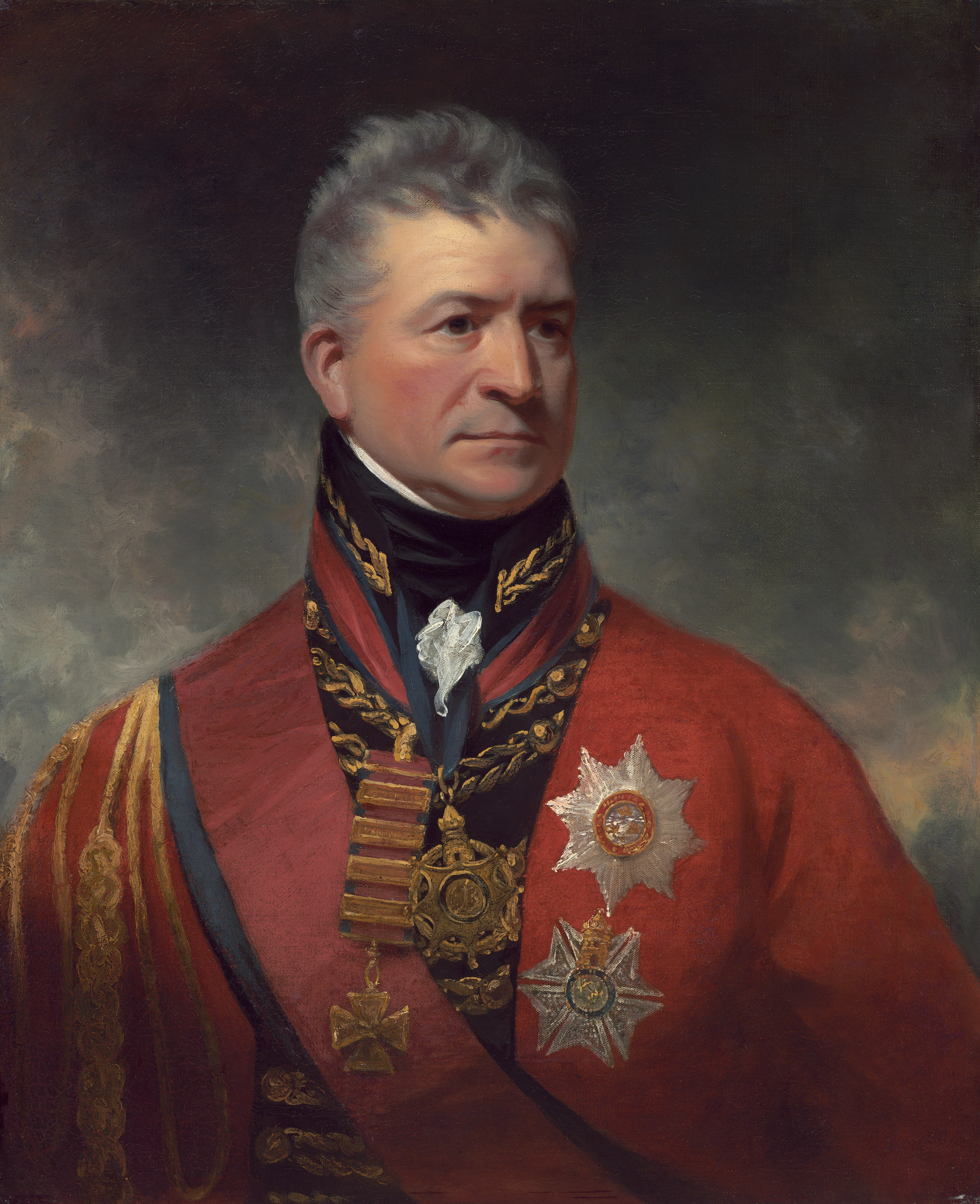
Thomas Picton

- August 24 – Thomas Picton, British soldier, colonial governor (k. 1815)
- August 25 – Israel Pellew, English naval officer (d. 1832)
- September 9 – Alexander Nasmyth, Scottish portrait and landscape painter (d. 1840)
- September 10 – Hannah Webster Foster, U.S. novelist (d. 1840)
- September 18 – Louis Friant, French Napoleonic soldier (d. 1829)
- September 20 – Jean-Jacques Dessalines, leader of the Haitian Revolution (d. 1806)

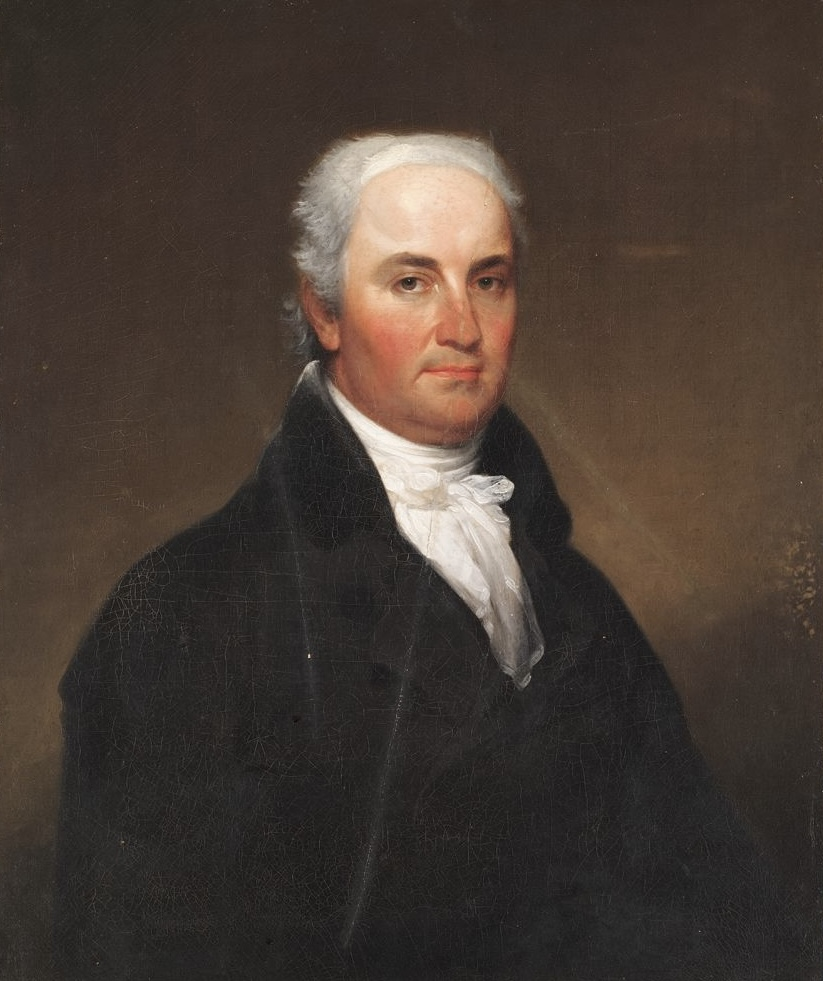
Christopher Gore

- September 21
  - Antoine Isaac Silvestre de Sacy, French linguist, orientalist (d. 1838)
  - Christopher Gore, U.S. lawyer, politician (d. 1827)
- September 25 – Maria Anna Thekla Mozart called Marianne, known as Bäsle ("little cousin"), cousin of Wolfgang Amadeus Mozart (d. 1841)
- September 26 – Cosme Argerich, Argentine Surgeon General (d. 1820)

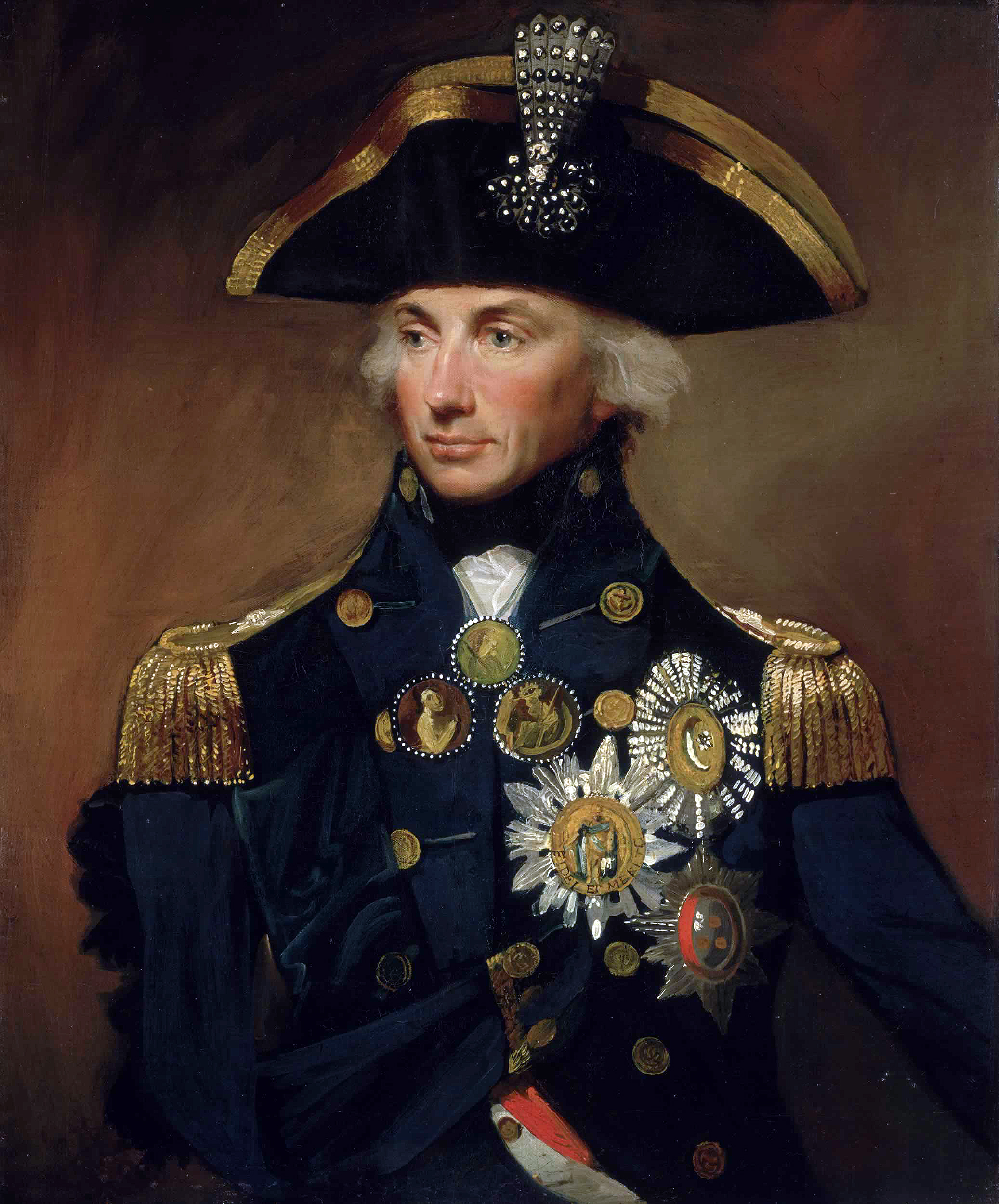
Horatio Nelson, 1st Viscount Nelson

- September 29
  - Horatio Nelson, 1st Viscount Nelson, British admiral (d. 1805)
  - Fanny von Arnstein, Austrian salonnière (d. 1818)
- October 5 – Seymour Fleming, British noblewoman (d. 1818)
- October 6 – Watkin Tench, British Marine officer (d. 1833)
- October 11 – Heinrich Wilhelm Matthias Olbers, German astronomer (d. 1840)
- October 15 – Johann Heinrich von Dannecker, German sculptor (d. 1841)

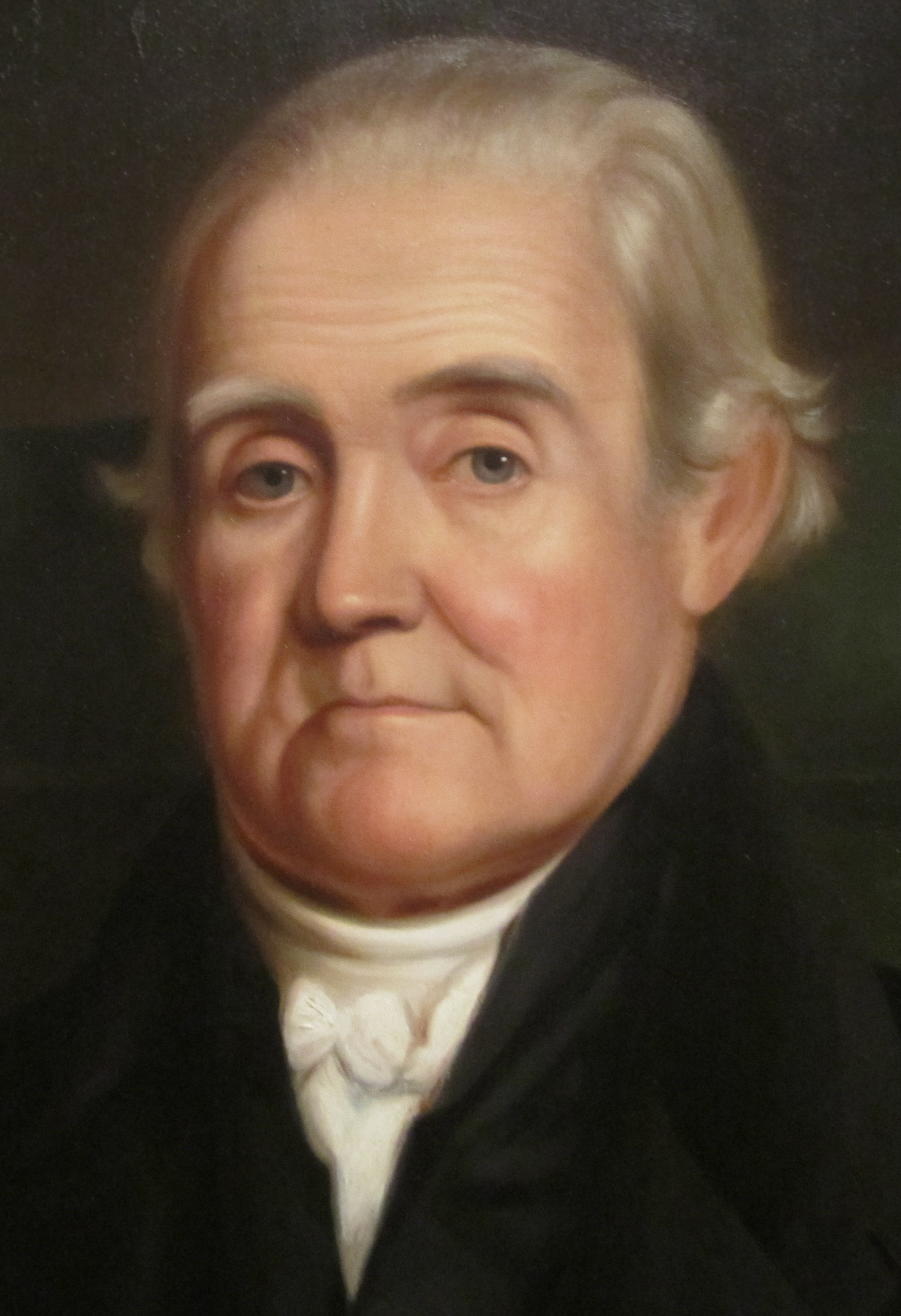
Noah Webster

- October 16 – Noah Webster, U.S. lexicographer (d. 1843)
- October 22/6 – Vincenzo Dandolo, Italian chemist, agriculturist (d. 1819)
- October 28 – John Sibthorp, English botanist (d. 1796)
- October 28 – Joseph-François-Louis-Charles de Damas, French general (d. 1829)
- October 31 – Thomas Gisborne, Anglican priest, abolitionist (d. 1846)
- November 5 – Louis-Marie Aubert du Petit-Thouars, French botanist (d. 1831)
- November 11
  - Carl Friedrich Zelter, German composer (d. 1832)
  - Caleb P. Bennett, U.S. soldier, politician (d. 1836)
- November 14 – William Bradley, British Royal Navy officer and cartographer (d. 1833)
- November 16 – Peter Andreas Heiberg, Danish author, philologist (d. 1841)
- December 5 – George Beauclerk, 4th Duke of St Albans (d. 1787)
- December 9 – Richard Colt Hoare, English antiquarian, archaeologist (d. 1838)
- December 21 – Jean Baptiste Eblé, French general (d. 1812)
- Georges Antoine Chabot, French jurist, statesman (d. 1819)
- Nicholas Fish, U.S. Revolutionary soldier (d. 1833)
- Anthimos Gazis, Greek scholar, philosopher (d. 1828)
- Samuel Hardy, U.S. lawyer and statesman from Virginia (d. 1785)
- Jamphel Gyatso, 8th Dalai Lama of Tibet (d. 1804)
- Charles Lee, U.S. Attorney General (d. 1815)
- Samuel Sterett, American politician, U.S. Representative for Maryland (d. 1833)
- Marie-Claire Heureuse Félicité, Empress of Haiti (d. 1858)
- Kamehameha I, King of Hawaii (d. c. 1819)

1759

- January 25 – Robert Burns, Scottish poet (d. 1796)
- January 29 – Louis Augustin Guillaume Bosc, French botanist (d. 1828)
- February 15 – Friedrich August Wolf, German philologist, archaeologist (d. 1824)
- February 22 – Claude Lecourbe, French general (d. 1815)
- April 19 – August Wilhelm Iffland, German actor (d. 1814)
- April 22 – James Freeman, first clergyman in America to call himself a Unitarian (d. 1835)

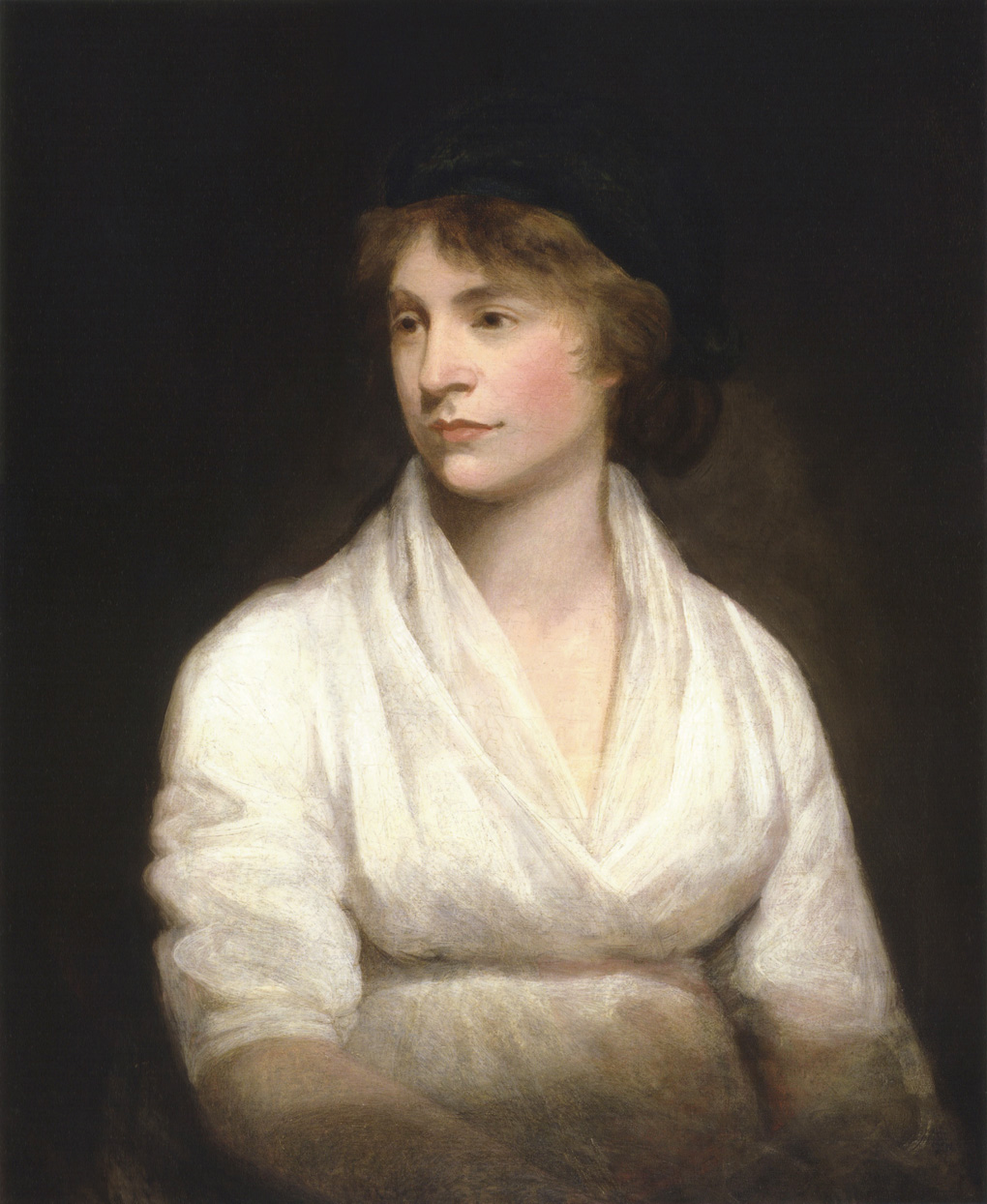
Mary Wollstonecraft

- April 27 – Mary Wollstonecraft, English feminist author (d. 1797)
- May 15 – Maria Theresia von Paradis, Austrian musician, composer (d. 1824)
- May 20 – William Thornton, American architect (d. 1828)
- May 21 – Joseph Fouché, French statesman (d. 1820)
- May 28 – William Pitt the Younger, Prime Minister of the United Kingdom (d. 1806)
- June 21 – Alexander J. Dallas, American statesman and financier (d. 1817)
- June 25 – William Plumer, American lawyer, Baptist lay preacher, and politician (d. 1850)
- July 2 – Nathan Read, American engineer and politician (d. 1849)
- July 31 – Ignaz Anton von Indermauer, Austrian nobleman and government official (d. 1796)

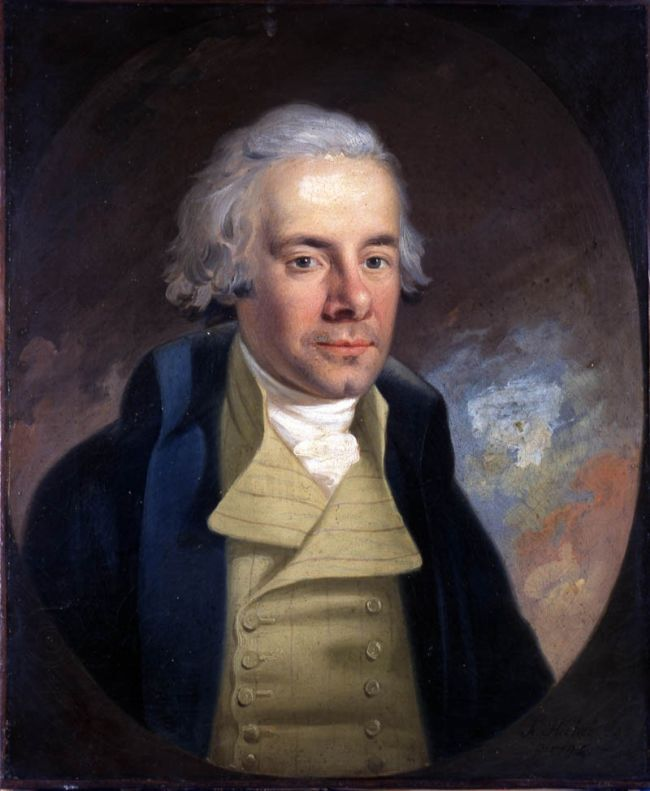
William Wilberforce

- August 24 – William Wilberforce, British abolitionist (d. 1833)
- September 10 – Lemuel Cook, American Revolutionary War veteran, centenarian (d. 1866)
- September 19 – William Kirby, English entomologist (d. 1850)
- October 25
  - Sophie Marie Dorothea of Württemberg, empress of Paul I of Russia (d. 1828)
  - William Grenville, 1st Baron Grenville, Prime Minister of the United Kingdom (d. 1834)
- October 26 – Georges Danton, French Revolutionary leader (d. 1794)

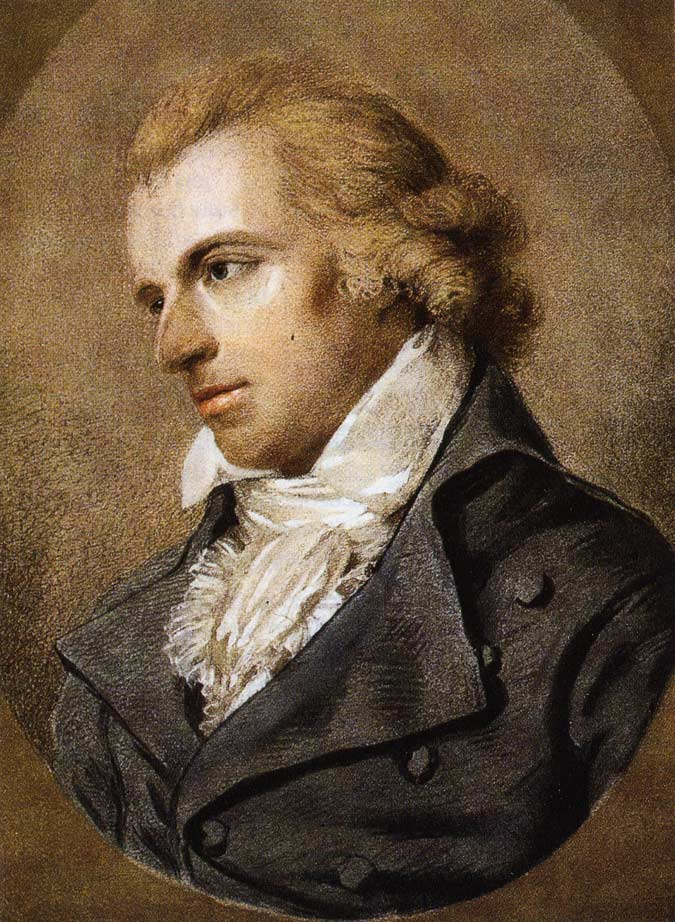
Friedrich Schiller

- November 10 – Friedrich Schiller, German writer (d. 1805)
- November 27 – Franz Krommer, Czech composer (d. 1831)
- November 23 – Felipe Enrique Neri, legislator and colonizer of Texas (d. 1820)
- December 2 – James Edward Smith, English botanist (d. 1828)
- Date unknown – Maria Petraccini, Italian anatomist, physician (d. 1791)
  - Salomea Deszner, Polish actress, singer and theater director (d. 1806)
  - Alice Flowerdew, British teacher, religious poet, hymnwriter (d. 1830)

== Deaths ==
1750

- January 16 – Ivan Trubetskoy, Russian field marshal (b. 1667)
- January 22 – Franz Xaver Josef von Unertl, Bavarian politician (b. 1675)
- January 23 – Ludovico Antonio Muratori, Italian historian and scholar (b. 1672)
- January 26 – Albert Schultens, Dutch philologist (b. 1686)
- January 29 – Sophia Schröder, Swedish soprano (b. 1712)
- February 7 – Algernon Seymour, 7th Duke of Somerset (b. 1684)
- February 8 – Aaron Hill, English writer (b. 1685)
- February 19 – Jan Frans van Bredael, Flemish painter (b. 1686)
- March 6 – Domenico Montagnana, Italian luthier (b. 1686)
- March 29 – James Jurin, British mathematician, doctor (b. 1684)
- April 7 – George Byng, 3rd Viscount Torrington, British Army general (b. 1701)
- May 3 – John Willison, Scottish minister, writer (b. 1680)
- May 17 – Georg Engelhard Schröder, Swedish artist (b. 1684)
- May 28 – Emperor Sakuramachi of Japan (b. 1720)
- June 15 – Marguerite de Launay, baronne de Staal, French author (b. 1684)
- July 15 – Vasily Tatishchev, Russian statesman, ethnographer (b. 1686)

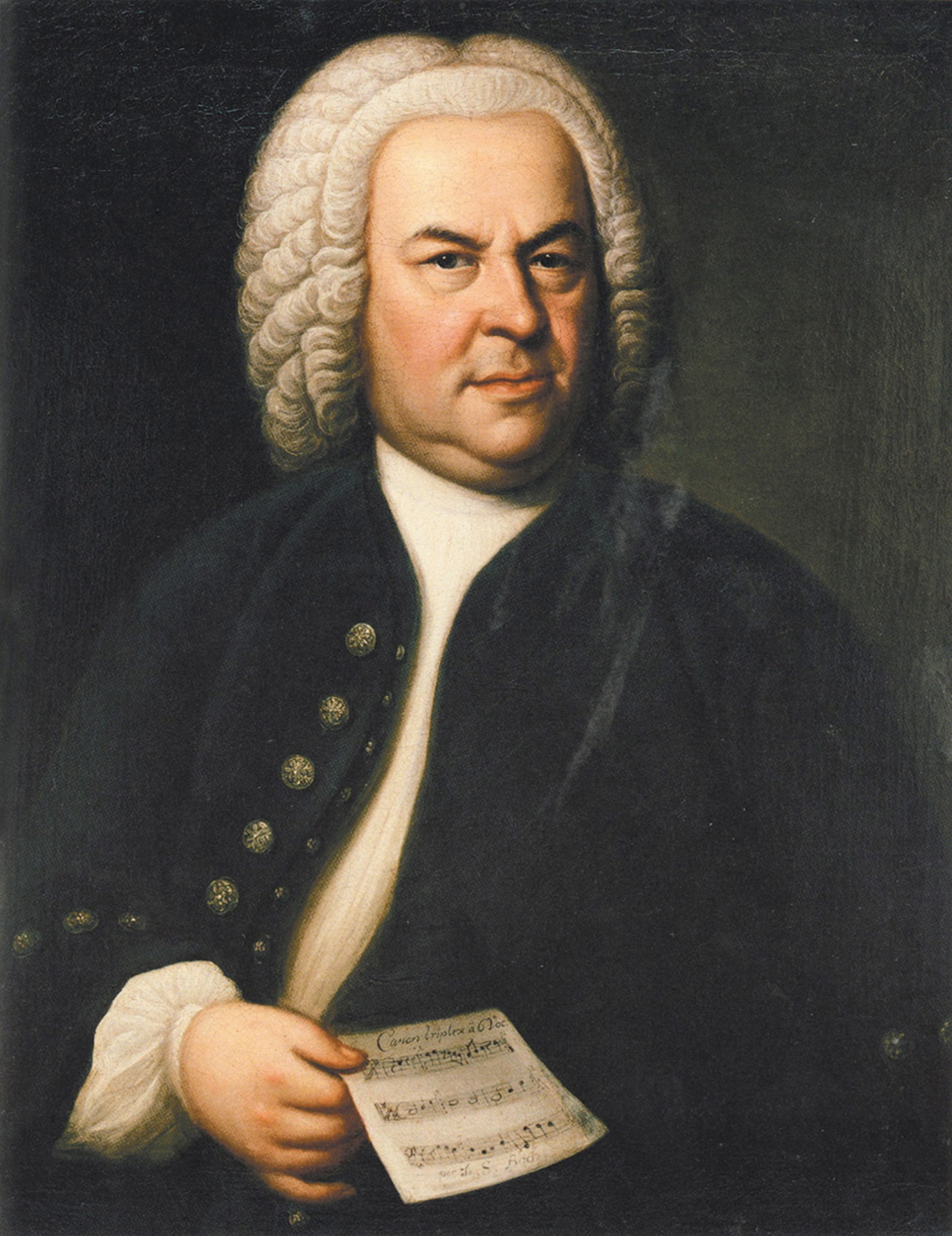
Johann Sebastian Bach

- July 28
  - Johann Sebastian Bach, German composer (b. 1685)
  - Conyers Middleton, English minister (b. 1683)
- July 31 – King John V of Portugal (b. 1689)
- August 8 – Charles Lennox, 2nd Duke of Richmond, English aristocrat, philanthropist and cricket patron (b. 1701)
- August 12 – Rachel Ruysch, Dutch painter (b. 1664)
- September 15 – Charles Theodore Pachelbel, German composer (b. 1690)
- October 3
  - Georg Matthias Monn, Austrian composer (b. 1717)
  - James MacLaine, Irish highwayman (b. 1724)
- October 16 – Sylvius Leopold Weiss, German composer, lutenist (b. 1687)
- November 1 – Gustaaf Willem van Imhoff, Dutch Governor-General of the Dutch East Indies (b. 1705)
- December 1 – Johann Gabriel Doppelmayr, German mathematician, astronomer, and cartographer (b. 1671)
- December 13 – Philemon Ewer, English shipbuilder (b. 1702)
- December 16
  - Nasir Jang Mir Ahmad, son of Turkic noble Nizam-ul-Mulk (b. 1712)
  - Nasir Jung, Head of Hyderabad State (b. 1712)

1751

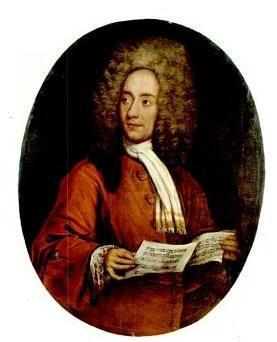
Tomaso Albinoni

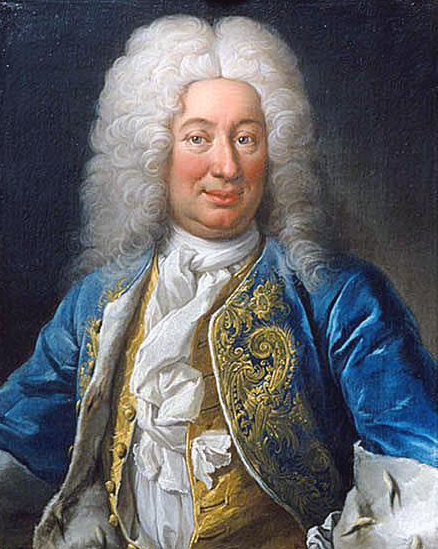
King Frederick I of Sweden

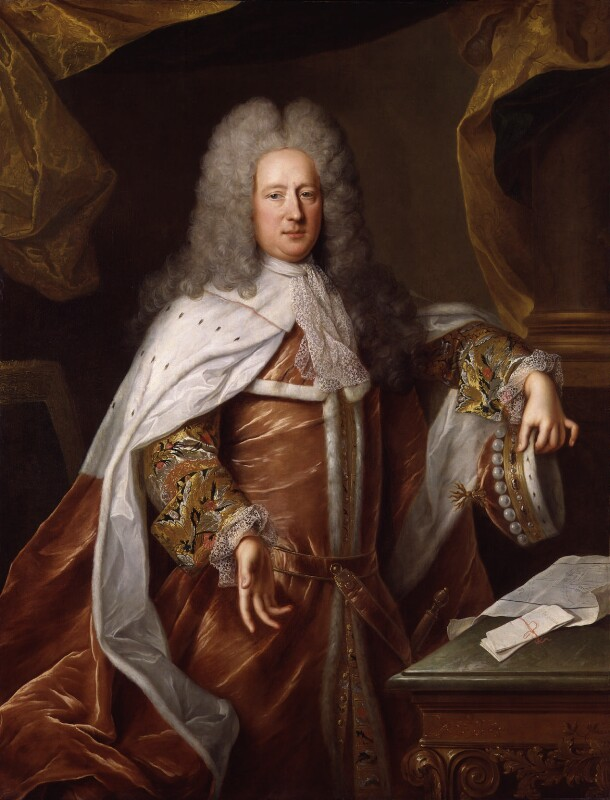
Henry St John, 1st Viscount Bolingbroke

- January 17 – Tomaso Albinoni, Italian composer (b. 1671)
- January 20 – John Hervey, 1st Earl of Bristol, English politician (b. 1665)
- January 25 – Paul Dudley, Massachusetts Attorney-General (b. 1675)
- January 29 – Martin Knutzen, German philosopher (b. 1713)
- February 5 – Henri François d'Aguesseau, Chancellor of France (b. 1668)
- February 7 – Albert Borgard, Danish artillery and engineer officer (b. 1659)
- March 21 – Johann Heinrich Zedler, German publisher (b. 1706)
- March 24 – János Pálffy, Hungarian field marshal, Palatine (b. 1664)
- March 25 – King Frederick I of Sweden (b. 1676)
- March 29 – Thomas Coram, English sea captain, philanthropist (b. c. 1668)
- March 31 – Frederick, Prince of Wales, Hanoverian-born heir to the British throne (b. 1707)
- April 19 – Peter Lacy, Irish-born Russian field marshal (b. 1678)
- April 20 – Gisela Agnes of Anhalt-Köthen, Princess of Anhalt-Köthen by birth and by marriage Princess of Anhalt-Dessau (b. 1722)
- May 20 – Domènec Terradellas, Spanish opera composer (b. 1713)
- June 9 – John Machin, English mathematician (b. c.1686)
- June 20 – Adriaan Valckenier, Dutch Governor-General of the Dutch East Indies (1737–1741) (b. 1695)
- August 18 – Samuel von Schmettau, Prussian field marshal (b. 1684)
- August 22 – Andrew Gordon, British physicist (b. 1712)
- August 30 – Christopher Polhem, Swedish scientist (b. 1661)
- October 22 – William IV, Prince of Orange, Stadtholder of the Dutch Republic (b. 1711)
- October 26 – Philip Doddridge, English nonconformist religious leader (b. 1702)
- November 18 – Abraham Vater, German anatomist (b. 1684)
- December 12 – Henry St John, 1st Viscount Bolingbroke, English statesman, philosopher (b. 1678)
- December 16 – Leopold II, Prince of Anhalt-Dessau, Prussian general (b. 1700)
- December 19 – Louise of Great Britain, queen of Frederick V of Denmark (b. 1724)
- December 29 – Charles, Count of Armagnac, French noble (b. 1684)

1752

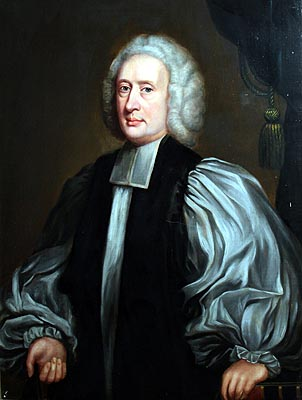
Joseph Butler

William Whiston

- January 4 – Gabriel Cramer, Swiss mathematician (b. 1704)
- January 14 – Devasahayam Pillai, beatified Indian Catholic (b. 1712)
- January 16 – Francis Blomefield, English topographer (b. 1705)
- February 9 – Fredrik Hasselqvist, Swedish traveller and naturalist (b. 1722)
- February 10 – Henriette of France, daughter of King Louis XV (b. 1727)
- February 15 – Beinta Broberg, notorious Faroese vicar's wife (b. 1667)
- March 9 – Claude Joseph Geoffroy, brother of Étienne François Geoffroy (b. 1685)
- March 21 – Gio Nicola Buhagiar, Maltese painter (b. 1698)
- April 29 – Matthew Michell, English politician (b. 1705)
- May 3 – Samuel Ogle, British provincial Governor of Maryland (b. 1694)
- May 6 – Sophia of Saxe-Weissenfels, Countess of Brandenburg-Bayreuth, German aristocrat and culture patron (b. 1684)
- May 22 – Johann Alexander Thiele, German painter (b. 1685)
- May 23 – William Bradford, British-born printer (b. 1663)
- June 16
  - Giulio Alberoni, Italian cardinal (b. 1664)
  - Joseph Butler, English priest, theologian (b. 1692)
- June 21 – Old Briton, Piankashaw chieftain (b. c. 1695)
- July 20 – Johann Christoph Pepusch, German composer (b. 1667)
- July 29 – Peter Warren, British admiral (b. 1703)
- August 22 – William Whiston, English mathematician (b. 1667)
- September 1 – Jacopo Amigoni, Italian painter (b. 1675)
- November 2 – Johann Albrecht Bengel, German scholar (b. 1687)
- November 5 – Carl Andreas Duker, German classical scholar (b. 1670)
- November 6 – Ralph Erskine, Scottish minister (b. 1685)
- November 27 – William Digby, 5th Baron Digby, English politician, baron (b. 1661)
- December 3 – Henri-Guillaume Hamal, Walloon musician and composer (b. 1685)
- December 11 – Adolphus Frederick III, Duke of Mecklenburg-Strelitz (b. 1686)

1753

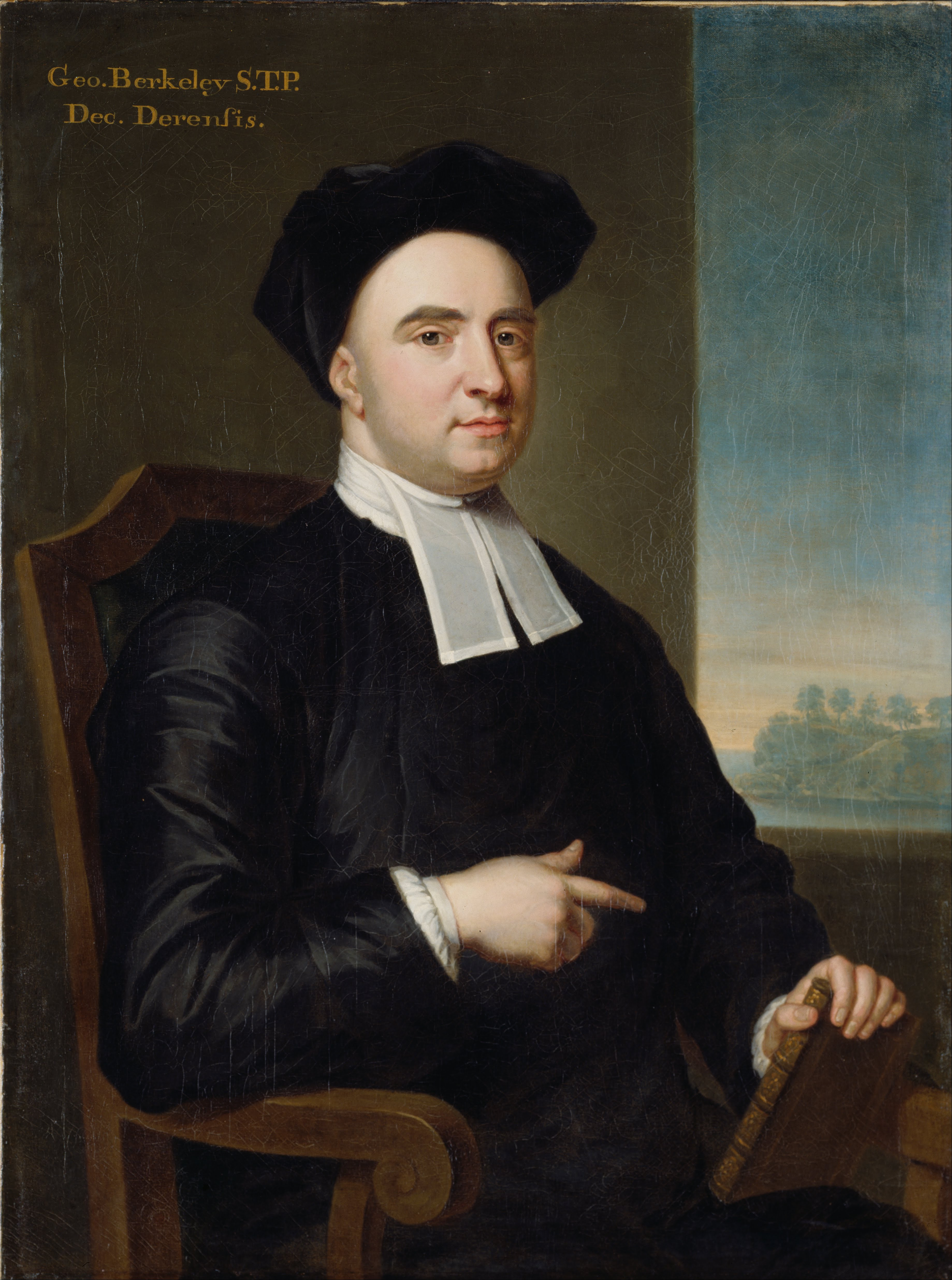
George Berkeley

- January 11 – Sir Hans Sloane, Irish-born physician and collector (b. 1660)
- January 14 – George Berkeley, Irish-born philosopher and bishop (b. 1685)
- January 23 – Louise Bénédicte de Bourbon, French royal princess, saloniste (b. 1676)
- February 16 – Giacomo Facco, Italian composer (b. 1676)
- February 22 – Eleonore of Löwenstein-Wertheim, German countess (b. 1686)
- May 23 – Franciszka Urszula Radziwiłłowa, Polish dramatist (b. 1705)
- June 7 – Archibald Cameron of Locheil, last Scottish Jacobite to be executed for treason (b. 1707)
- June 10 – Joachim Ludwig Schultheiss von Unfriedt, German architect (b. 1678)
- August 5 – Charlotta Elisabeth van der Lith, politically active Governor's wife in Surinam (b. 1700)
- August 6 – Georg Wilhelm Richmann, Russian physicist (struck by lightning) (b. 1711)
- August 19 – Balthasar Neumann, German architect and military engineer (b. 1687)
- September 20 – Johann Georg Weishaupt, German lawyer (b. 1716)
- October 12 – Sir Danvers Osborn, 3rd Baronet, British politician and governor of the Province of New York (b. 1715)
- October 26 – Margareta von Ascheberg, Swedish land owner, countess and acting regimental colonel (b. 1671)
- November 9 – Charles August, Prince of Nassau-Weilburg, Prince of Nassau-Weilburg (1719–1753) (b. 1685)
- November 10 – Bertrand-François Mahé de La Bourdonnais, French naval officer and governor of Isle de France (Mauritius) (b. 1699)
- November 22 – Samuel-Jacques Bernard, French nobility (b. 1686)
- December 4 – Richard Boyle, 3rd Earl of Burlington, English architect (b. 1694)
- December 25 – Godolphin Arabian, Yemeni-foaled English thoroughbred stallion (b. c. 1724)

1754

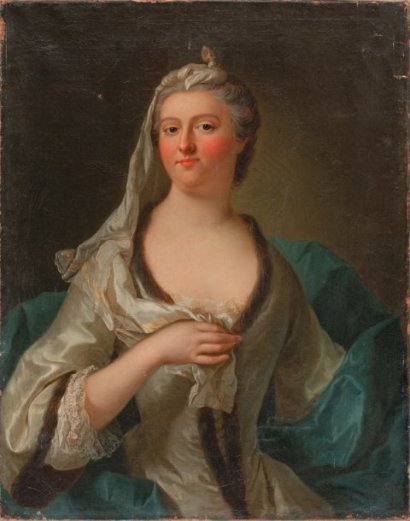
Marie Isabelle de Rohan, Duchess of Tallard died 5 January

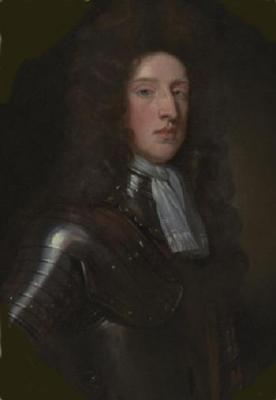
Lord Archibald Hamilton died 5 April

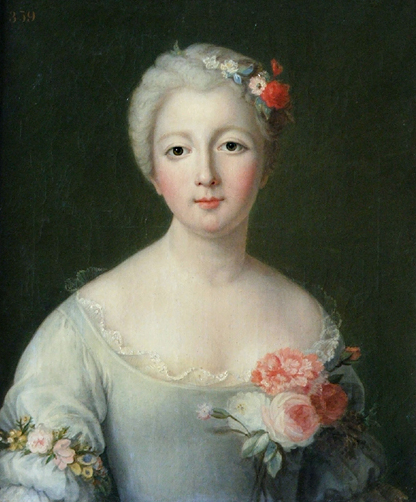
Maria Teresa Felicitas d'Este died 30 April

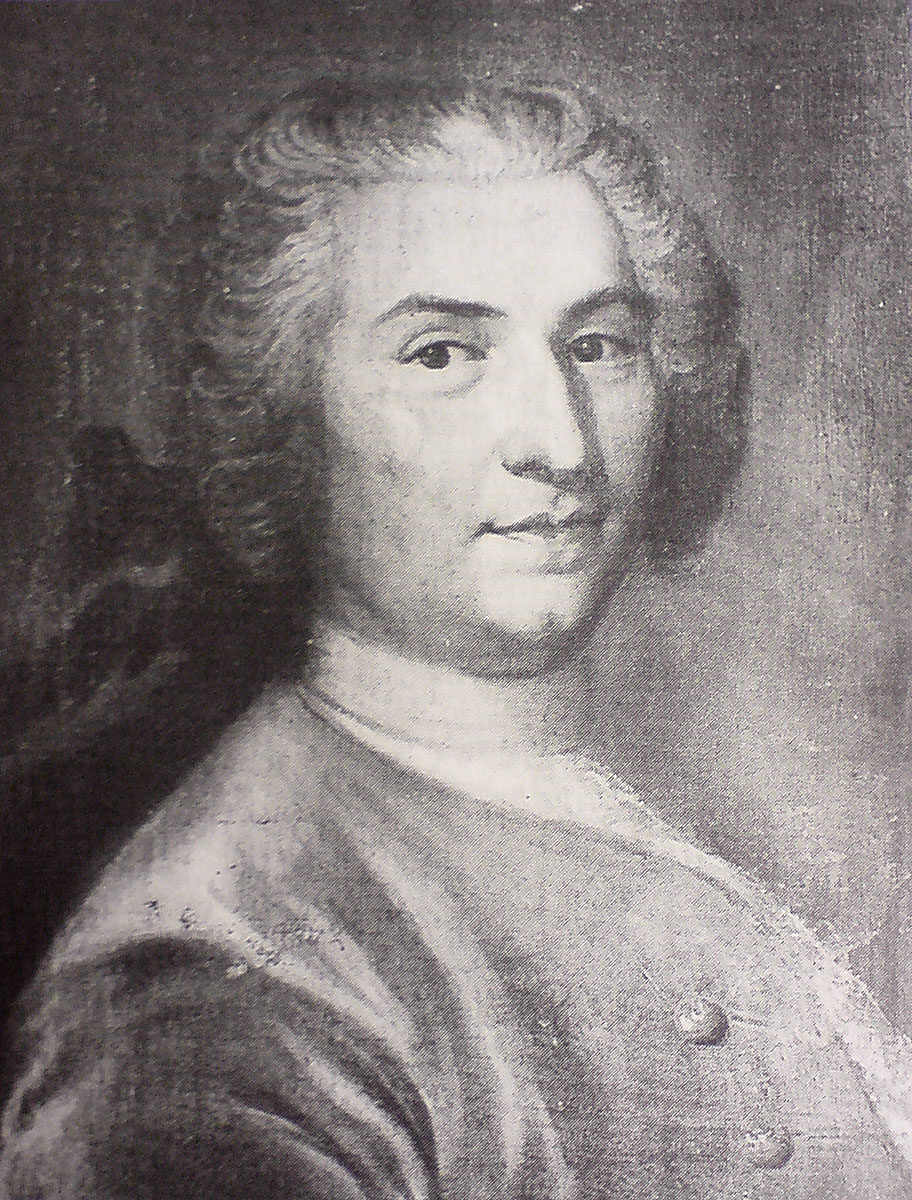
Carl Georg Siöblad died 1 September

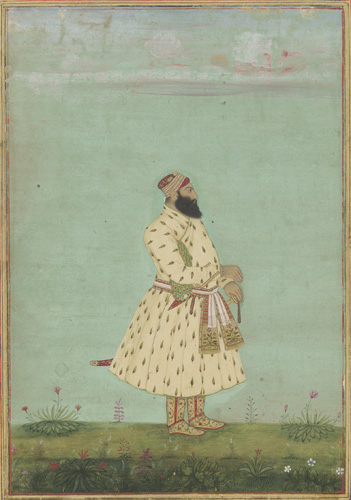
Safdar Jang died 5 October

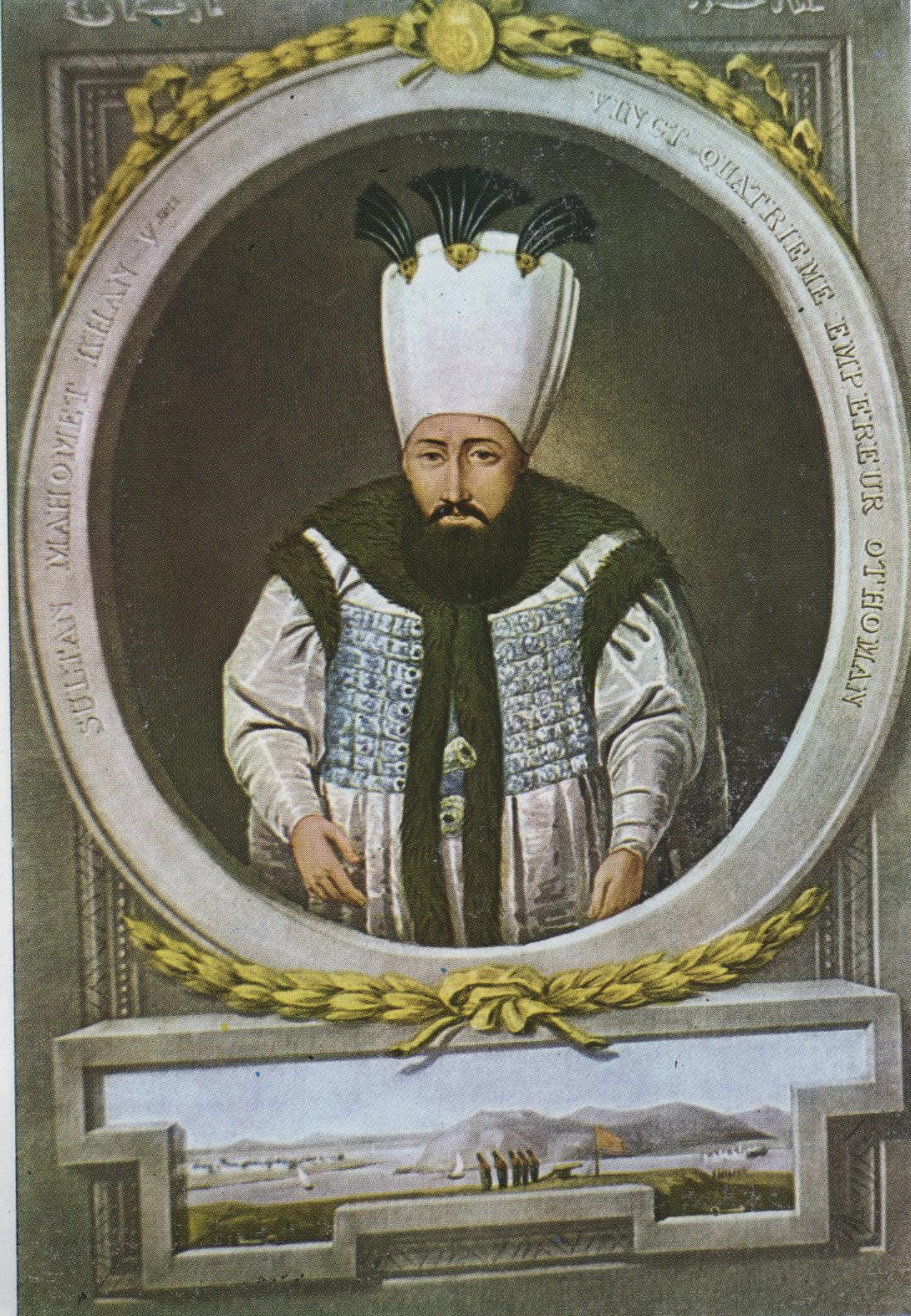
Mahmud I died 13 December

- January 5 – Marie Isabelle de Rohan, Duchess of Tallard, French noblewoman, granddaughter of Madame de Ventadour (b. 1699)
- January 10 – Edward Cave, English editor, publisher (b. 1691)
- January 16 – Edward Trelawny, British governor of Jamaica 1738–1752 (b. 1699)
- January 17 – Filippo Maria Monti, Cardinal in the Catholic Church (b. 1675)
- January 20 – Christian August, Duke of Schleswig-Holstein-Sonderburg-Augustenburg (b. 1696)
- January 28 – Ludvig Holberg, Norwegian dramatist and writer (b. 1684)
- February 2 – William Benson, English architect and self-serving Whig place-holder (b. 1682)
- February 5 – Caroline Thielo, Danish actress (b. 1735)
- February 16 – Richard Mead, English physician (b. 1673)
- February 22 – Xavier, Duke of Aquitaine, fils de France of the House of Bourbon (b. 1753)
- February 27 – Tomás de Almeida, first Patriarch of Lisbon (b. 1670)
- March 4 – Léopold Philippe d'Arenberg, 4th Duke of Arenberg (b. 1690)
- March 6 – Henry Pelham, Prime Minister of the United Kingdom (b. 1694)
- March 9 – Alexander Brodie, Scottish clan chief and politician (b. 1697)
- March 10 – Marc de Beauvau, Prince of Craon (b. 1679)
- March 22 – Samuel Bourn the Younger, English dissenting minister (b. 1689)
- March 23 – Johann Jakob Wettstein, Swiss theologian (b. 1693)
- March 31 – Hilario a Jesu Costa, Roman Catholic prelate, Apostolic Vicar of Eastern Tonking (1737–1754), Titular Bishop of Corycus (1735–1737) (b. 1696)
- April 2 – Thomas Carte, English historian (b. 1686)
- April 4 – Charles Guillaume Loys de Bochat, 18th-century Swiss jurist and antiquarian (b. 1695)
- April 5 – Lord Archibald Hamilton, Scottish officer of the Royal Navy (b. 1673)
- April 8 – José de Carvajal y Lancáster, Spanish statesman (b. 1698)
- April 9 – Christian Wolff, German philosopher, mathematician, scientist (b. 1679)
- April 15 – Jacopo Riccati, Italian mathematician (b. 1676)
- April 21 – Thomas Lawrence, merchant who was elected to six one-year terms as mayor of Philadelphia (b. 1689)
- April 27 – Marie Karoline von Fuchs-Mollard (b. 1681)
- April 30 – Maria Teresa Felicitas d'Este (b. 1726)
- May 14 – Pierre-Claude Nivelle de La Chaussée, French writer (b. 1692)
- May 18 – Sir John Strange, English politician (b. 1696)
- May 23 – John Wood, the Elder, English architect (b. 1704)
- June 2 – Ebenezer Erskine, Scottish religious dissenter (b. 1680)
- June 7 – Nicolai Eigtved, Danish architect (b. 1701)
- June 21 – Johann Baptist Martinelli, Austrian architect (b. 1701)
- June 28
  - Sollom Emlyn, Irish legal writer (b. 1697)
  - Martin Folkes, English antiquarian (b. 1690)
- July 4 – Philippe Néricault Destouches, French playwright who wrote 22 plays (b. 1680)
- July 14 – François Dominique de Barberie de Saint-Contest, French diplomat (b. 1701)
- August 2 – John Waller, American politician who served in the House of Burgess in 1714 (b. 1673)
- August 14 – Maria Anna of Austria, Archduchess of Austria and Queen consort of Portugal (b. 1683)
- August 26 – Charles Powlett, 3rd Duke of Bolton (b. 1685)
- September 1 – Carl Georg Siöblad, Swedish naval officer, Governor of Malmöhus County 1740–1754 (b. 1683)
- September 2 – Sir Tancred Robinson, 3rd Baronet, English Rear admiral and Lord Mayor of York (b. 1685)
- September 9 – Peter Mawney, member of one of the few French Huguenot families that remained in Rhode Island (b. 1689)
- October 4 – Tanacharison, Catawba Indian chief (b. c. 1700)
- October 5 – Safdar Jang (b. 1708)
- October 8 – Henry Fielding, English novelist and dramatist known for his earthy humour and satire (b. 1707)
- October 10 – Dorothea Krag, Danish General Postmaster and noble (b. 1675)
- October 13
  - Mahadhammaraza Dipadi, last king of Toungoo dynasty of Burma (Myanmar), 1733–1752 (b. 1714)
  - Hark Olufs, North Frisian sailor (b. 1708)
- October 28 – Friedrich von Hagedorn, German poet (b. 1708)
- November 20 – Robert Darwin of Elston, English lawyer and physician (b. 1682)
- November 24 – William Tutty, English-Canadian clergyman (b. 1715)
- November 27 – Abraham de Moivre, French mathematician (b. 1667)
- November 30 – Charles Willing, Philadelphia merchant (b. 1710)
- December 5 – Henry de Nassau d'Auverquerque, 1st Earl of Grantham (b. 1673)
- December 12 – Wu Jingzi, Chinese writer (b. 1701)
- December 13 – Mahmud I, Sultan of the Ottoman Empire from 1730 to 1754 (b. 1696)
- December 22 – Willem van Keppel, 2nd Earl of Albemarle (b. 1702)
- December 27 – Charles Craven, son of Sir William Craven and Margaret Clapham (b. 1682)

1755

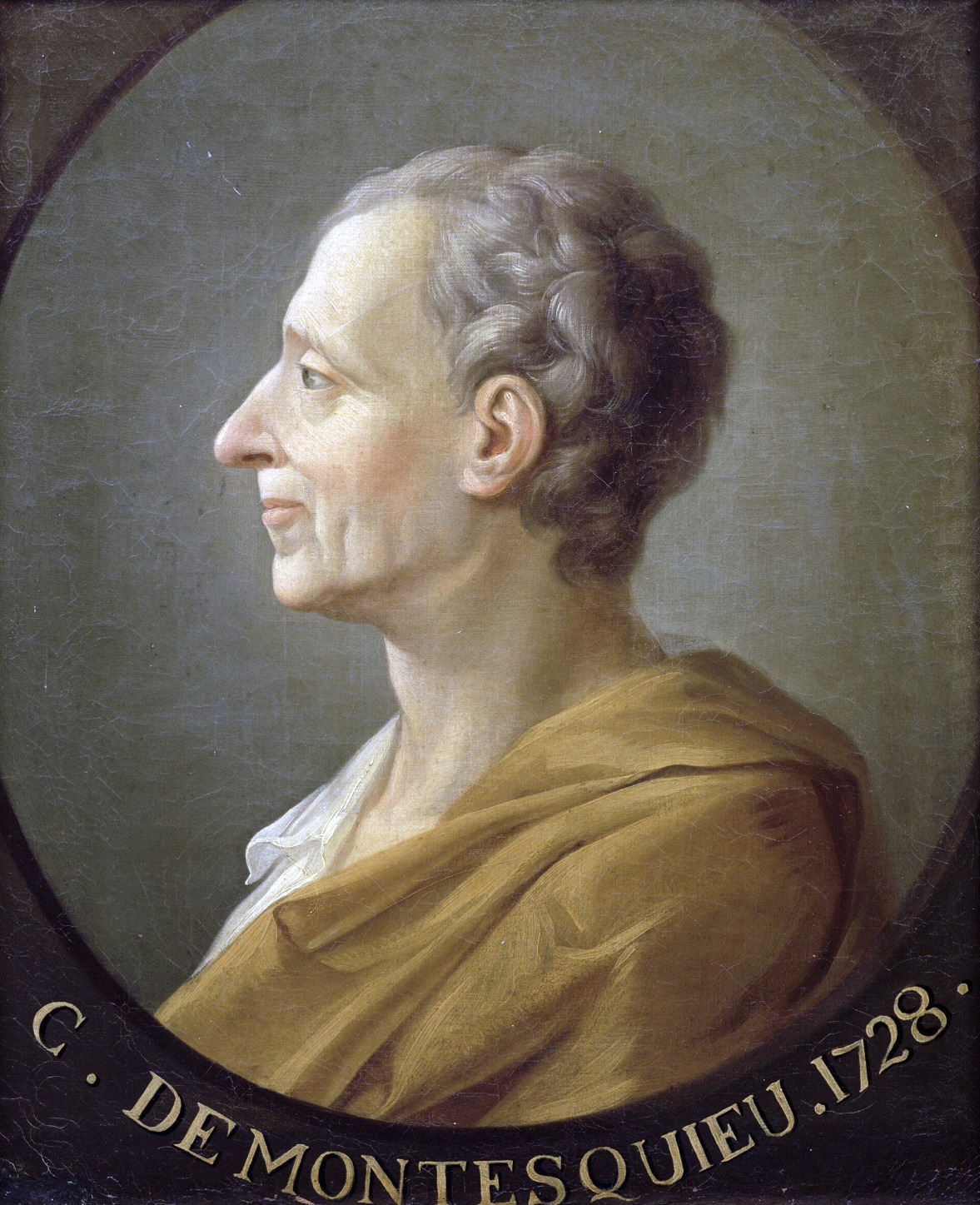
Montesquieu

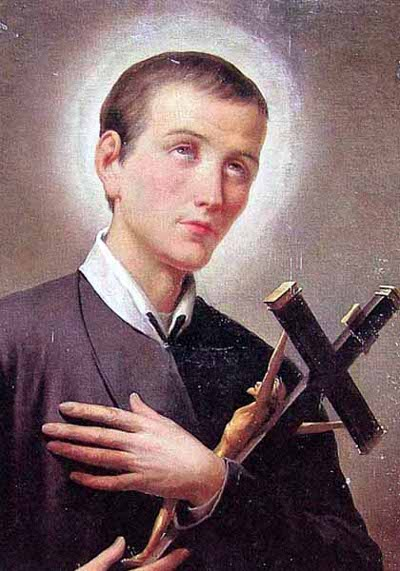
Saint Gerard Majella

- February 10 – Montesquieu, French writer (b. 1689)
- February 11 – Francesco Scipione, marchese di Maffei, Italian archaeologist (b. 1675)
- March 2 – Louis de Rouvroy, duc de Saint-Simon, French writer (b. 1675)
- March 7 – Thomas Wilson, Bishop of Sodor and Man (b. 1663)
- March 10 – Johann David Köhler, German historian (b. 1684)
- April 6 – Richard Rawlinson, English minister, antiquarian (b. 1690)
- April 30 – Jean-Baptiste Oudry, French painter (b. 1686)
- June 26 – Iyasu II, Emperor of Ethiopia (b. c. 1723)
- July 9 – Daniel Liénard de Beaujeu, Canadian officer during the Seven Years' War (b. 1711)
- July 13 – Edward Braddock, British general (b. c. 1695)
- July 14 – Jacques-Nompar III de Caumont, duc de La Force, French nobleman (b. 1714)
- August 13 – Francesco Durante, Italian composer (b. 1684)
- September 2 – Princess Marie Zéphyrine of France, sister of Louis XVI (b. 1750)
- September 8
  - Jacques Legardeur de Saint-Pierre, Canadian military commander (b. 1701)
  - Hendrick Theyanoguin, Mohawk Council leader killed in the Battle of Lake George (b. c. 1691)
  - Ephraim Williams, American philanthropist (b. 1715)
- September 9 – Johann Lorenz von Mosheim, German historian (b. 1694)
- September 13 – Pierre Gaultier de La Vérendrye, French-Canadian explorer (b. 1714)
- October 4 – Johann Georg Christian, Prince of Lobkowicz, Austrian field marshal (b. 1686)
- October 16 – Gerard Majella, Italian Roman Catholic lay brother and saint (b. 1725)
- October 22 – Elisha Williams, American rector of Yale College (b. 1694)
- October 28 – Joseph Bodin de Boismortier, French composer (b. 1689)
- November 25 – Johann Georg Pisendel, German musician (b. 1687)
- December 1 – Maurice Greene, English composer (b. 1696)
- December 5 – William Cavendish, 3rd Duke of Devonshire (b. 1698)
- approximate date
  - Queen Nanny of the Maroons, Jamaican national heroine (b. 1686)
  - Cai Wan, politically influential Chinese poet (b. 1695)

1756

- January 17 – Isabella Simons, banker in the Austrian Netherlands (b. 1694)
- January 18 – Francis George of Schönborn-Buchheim (b. 1682)
- February 22 – Akdun, Chinese Manchu statesman (b. 1685)

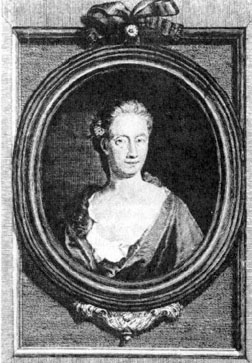
Eliza Haywood

- February 25 – Eliza Haywood, English actress, writer (b. 1693)
- March 1 – Antonio Bernacchi, Italian opera singer (b. 1685)
- April 4 – Marie Sophie de Courcillon, French noblewoman and Duchess of Rohan-Rohan, Princess of Soubise by marriage (b. 1713)
- April 10 – Giacomo Antonio Perti, Italian composer (b. 1661)
- April 18 – Jacques Cassini, French astronomer (b. 1677)
- July 1 – Giambattista Nolli, Italian architect (b. 1701)
- July 24 – George Vertue, English engraver, antiquary (b. 1684)
- September 8 – Jonathan Nichols, Jr., Rhode Island colonial deputy governor (b. 1712)
- September 22 – Abu l-Hasan Ali I, ruler of Tunisia (b. 1688)
- October 13 – John Henley, English minister (b. 1692)
- October 15 – William Grimston, 1st Viscount Grimston, Irish noble (b. 1684)
- October 26 – Roland-Michel Barrin de La Galissonière, governor of New France (b. 1693)
- October 28 – Charles Somerset, 4th Duke of Beaufort (b. 1709)
- December 8 – William Stanhope, 1st Earl of Harrington, English statesman, diplomat (b. c. 1690)
- December 11 – Maria Amalia, Holy Roman Empress (b. 1701)
- date unknown
  - Bernard Accama, Dutch painter (b. 1697)
  - Frehat Bat Avraham, Jewish Poet
  - William Beverley, American legislator, civil servant, planter, and landowner (b. 1696)

1757

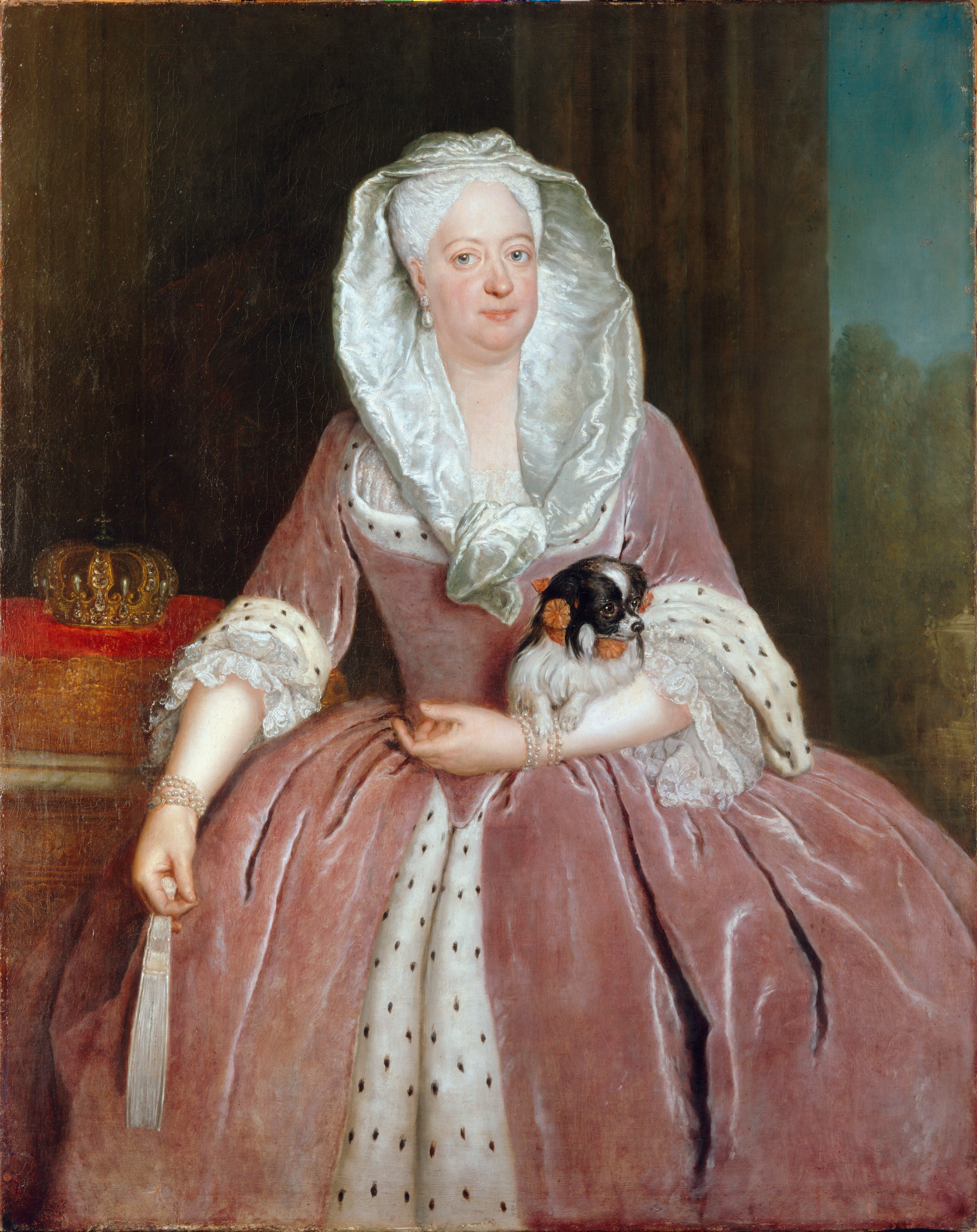
Sophia Dorothea of Hanover

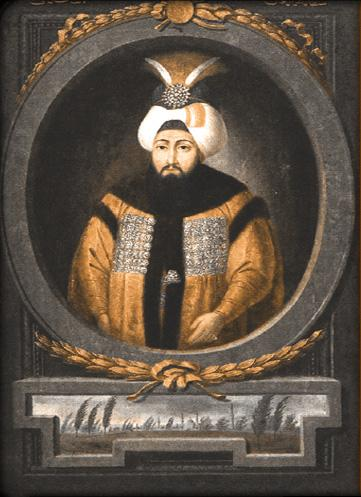
Sultan Osman III

- January 9 – Bernard Le Bovier de Fontenelle, French scientist, man of letters (b. 1657)
- January 19 – Thomas Ruddiman, Scottish classical scholar (b. 1664)
- February 5 – Horatio Walpole, 1st Baron Walpole of Wolterton, English diplomat (b. 1678)
- March 1 – Edward Moore, English writer (b. 1712)
- March 8 – Thomas Blackwell, Scottish classical scholar (b. 1701)
- March 12 – Giuseppe Galli Bibiena, Italian architect/painter (b. 1696)
- March 14 – John Byng, British admiral (executed) (b. 1704)
- March 27 – Johann Stamitz, Czech-born composer (b. 1717)
- March 28 – Robert-François Damiens, French domestic servant, executed for the attempted assassination of Louis XV (b. 1715)
- April 4 – Spencer Phips, Acting governor of the Province of Massachusetts Bay (b. 1685)
- April 20 – Paul Alphéran de Bussan, French bishop (b. 1684)
- May 6
  - Maximilian Ulysses Count Browne, Austrian field marshal (b. 1705)
  - Charles FitzRoy, 2nd Duke of Grafton, British politician (b. 1683)
  - Kurt Christoph Graf von Schwerin, Prussian field marshal (b. 1684)
- June 28 – Sophia Dorothea of Hanover, queen consort of Frederick William I (b. 1687)
- July 2 – Siraj ud-Daulah, the last independent ruler of Bengal of undivided India (b. 1733)
- July 8 – Daniel Parke Custis, American planter (b. 1711)
- July 23 – Domenico Scarlatti, Italian composer (b. 1685)
- August 3 – Charles William Frederick, Margrave of Brandenburg-Ansbach (b. 1712)
- August 17 – Aaron Cleveland, American clergyman (b. 1715)
- August 28 – David Hartley, English philosopher (b. 1705)
- August 30 – Bulleh Shah, Sufi poet (b. 1680)
- September 24 – Aaron Burr Sr., President of Princeton University (b. 1716)
- October 2 – Aloysius Centurione, Italian Jesuit (b. 1686)
- October 17 – René Antoine Ferchault de Réaumur, French scientist (b. 1683)
- October 25 – Antoine Augustin Calmet, French theologian (b. 1672)
- October 30
  - Osman III, Ottoman Sultan (b. 1699)
  - Edward Vernon, English naval officer (b. 1684)
- December 11
  - Colley Cibber, English poet laureate, actor-manager (b. 1671)
  - Edmund Curll, English bookseller, publisher (b. 1675)
- December 14 – Levan Abashidze, Georgian politician
- December 15 – John Dyer, Welsh poet (b. 1699)
- December 28 – Princess Caroline of Great Britain, fourth child and third daughter of George II (b. 1713)
- Date unknown – Rika Maja, Sami shaman (b. 1661)

1758

- January 7 – Allan Ramsay, Scottish poet (b. 1686)
- January 17 – James Hamilton, 6th Duke of Hamilton, Scottish peer (b. 1724)
- January 18 – François Nicole, French mathematician (b. 1683)
- February 10 – Thomas Ripley, English architect (b. 1683)
- March 2 – Pierre Guérin de Tencin, French cardinal (b. 1679)
- March 6 – Henry Vane, 1st Earl of Darlington, English politician (b. c. 1705)
- March 18
  - Matthew Hutton, Archbishop of Canterbury (b. 1693)
  - Thomas Zebrowski, Lithuanian Jesuit scientist (b. 1714)

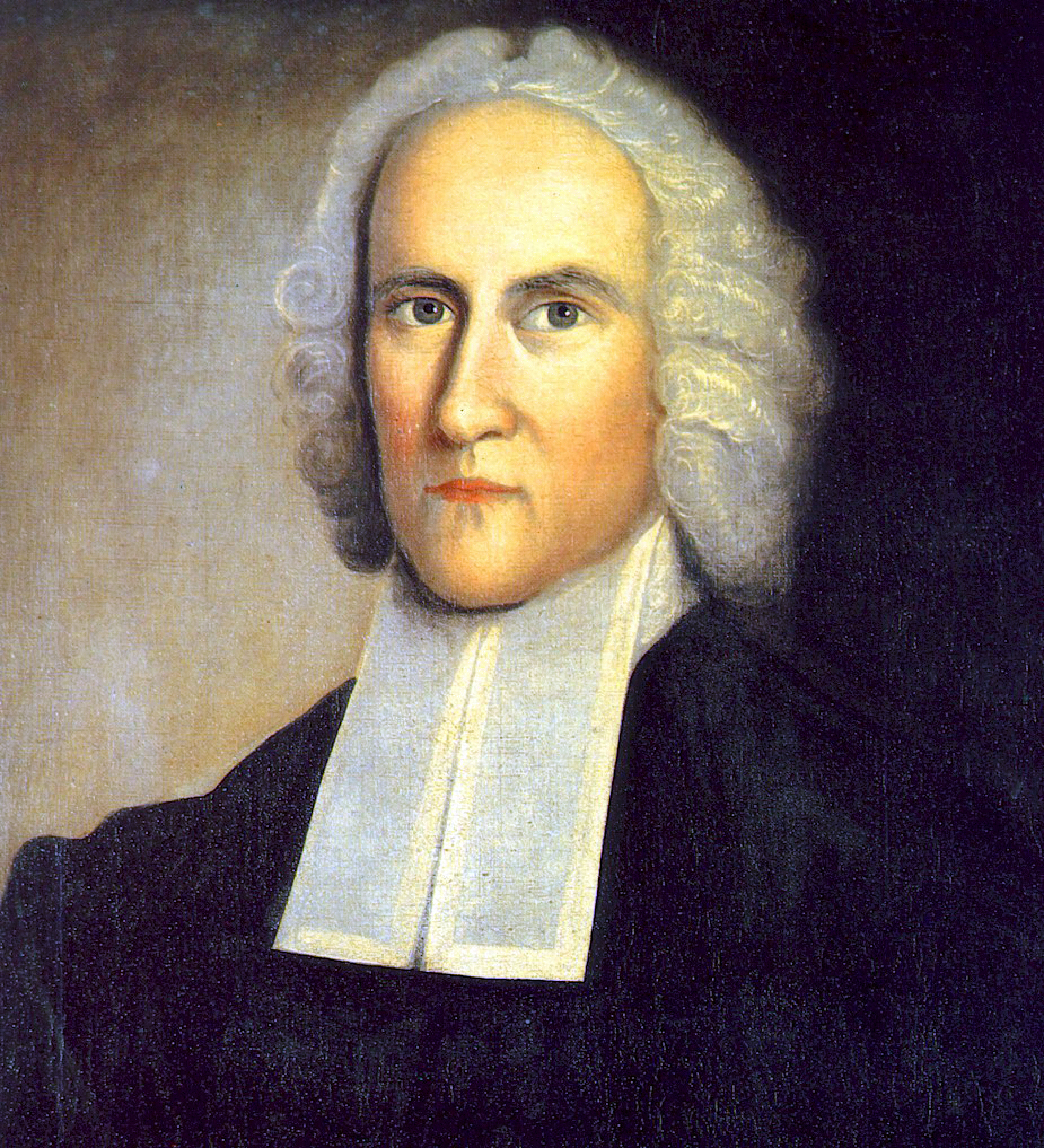
Jonathan Edwards

- March 22
  - Jonathan Edwards, American minister (b. 1703)
  - Richard Leveridge, English bass and composer (b. 1670)
- April 7 – Joseph Blanchard, American soldier (b. 1704)
- April 21 – Francesco Zerafa, Maltese architect (b. 1679)
- April 22 – Antoine de Jussieu, French naturalist (b. 1686)
- April 30 – François d'Agincourt, French composer (b. 1684)
- May 3 – Pope Benedict XIV (b. 1675)
- May 28 – Ernst August II, Duke of Saxe-Weimar and Eisenach (b. 1737)
- May 31 – Marguerite de Lussan, French historical novelist (b. 1682)
- June 9 – Antonio de los Reyes Correa, Puerto Rican soldier (b. c. 1665)
- June 12 – Prince Augustus William of Prussia (b. 1722)
- July 6 – George Howe, 3rd Viscount Howe, British general (in battle) (b. c. 1725)

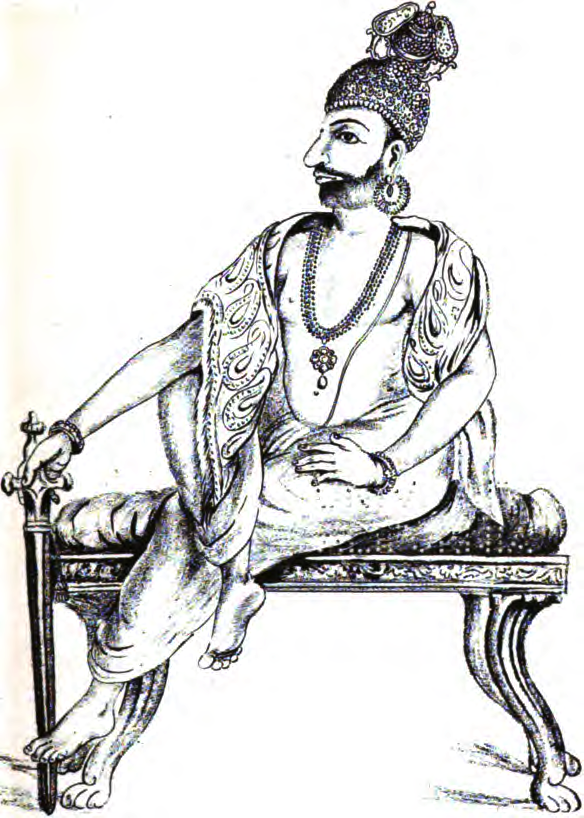
Marthanda Varma

- July 7 – Marthanda Varma, Rani of Attingal (b. 1706)
- July 15 – Ambrosius Stub, Danish poet (b. 1705)
- July 18 – Duncan Campbell, Scottish soldier
- August 2 – George Booth, 2nd Earl of Warrington, English noble (b. 1675)
- August 15 – Pierre Bouguer, French mathematician (b. 1698)
- August 17 – Stepan Fyodorovich Apraksin, Russian soldier (b. 1702)
- August 23 – Ulrika Eleonora von Düben, Swedish lady in waiting (b. 1722)
- August 27 – Barbara of Portugal, Princess of Portugal and Queen of Spain (b. 1711)
- September 5 – Dmitry Ivanovich Vinogradov, Russian chemist (b. c. 1720)
- September 15 – Adina Beg Khan, Nawab of Punjab (b. 1710)
- September 23 – John FitzPatrick, 1st Earl of Upper Ossory (b. 1719)
- October 2 (bur.) – Philip Southcote, English landscape gardener (b. 1698)
- October 12 – Richard Molesworth, 3rd Viscount Molesworth, British field marshal (b. 1680)

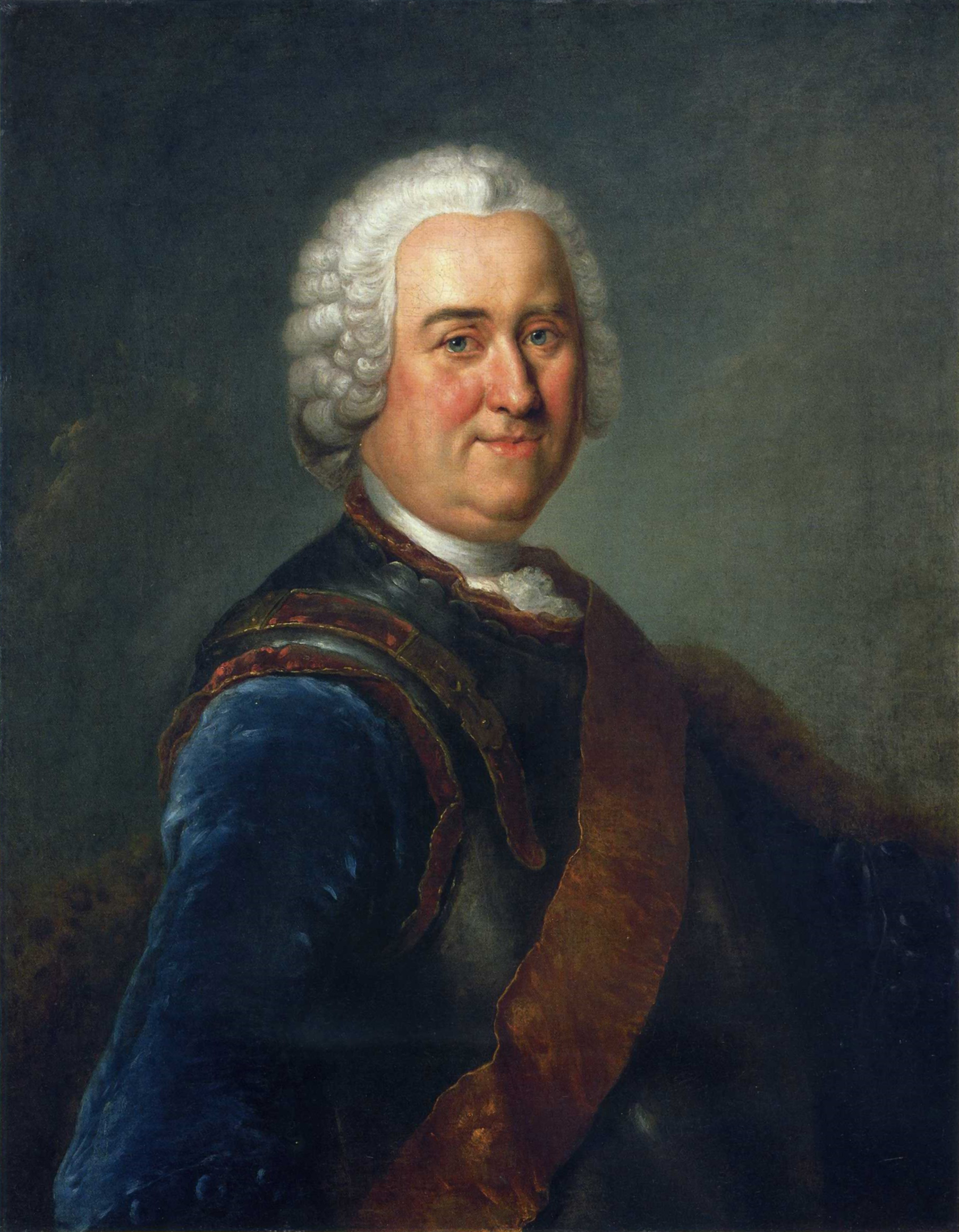
James Francis Edward Keith

- October 14
  - Wilhelmine of Prussia, Margravine of Brandenburg-Bayreuth, daughter of Friedrich Wilhelm I of Prussia (b. 1709)
  - James Francis Edward Keith, Scottish soldier and Prussian field marshal (b. 1696)
- October 20 – Charles Spencer, 3rd Duke of Marlborough, British politician (b. 1706)
- October 25/8 – Theophilus Cibber, English actor (b. 1703)
- November 5 – Hans Egede, Norwegian Lutheran missionary (b. 1686)
- November 12 – John Cockburn, Scottish politician (b. c. 1679)
- November 20 – Johan Helmich Roman, Swedish composer (b. 1694)
- November 22 – Richard Edgcumbe, 1st Baron Edgcumbe, English politician (b. 1680)
- November 27 – Senesino, Italian singer (b. 1686)
- December 5 – Johann Friedrich Fasch, German composer (b. 1688)

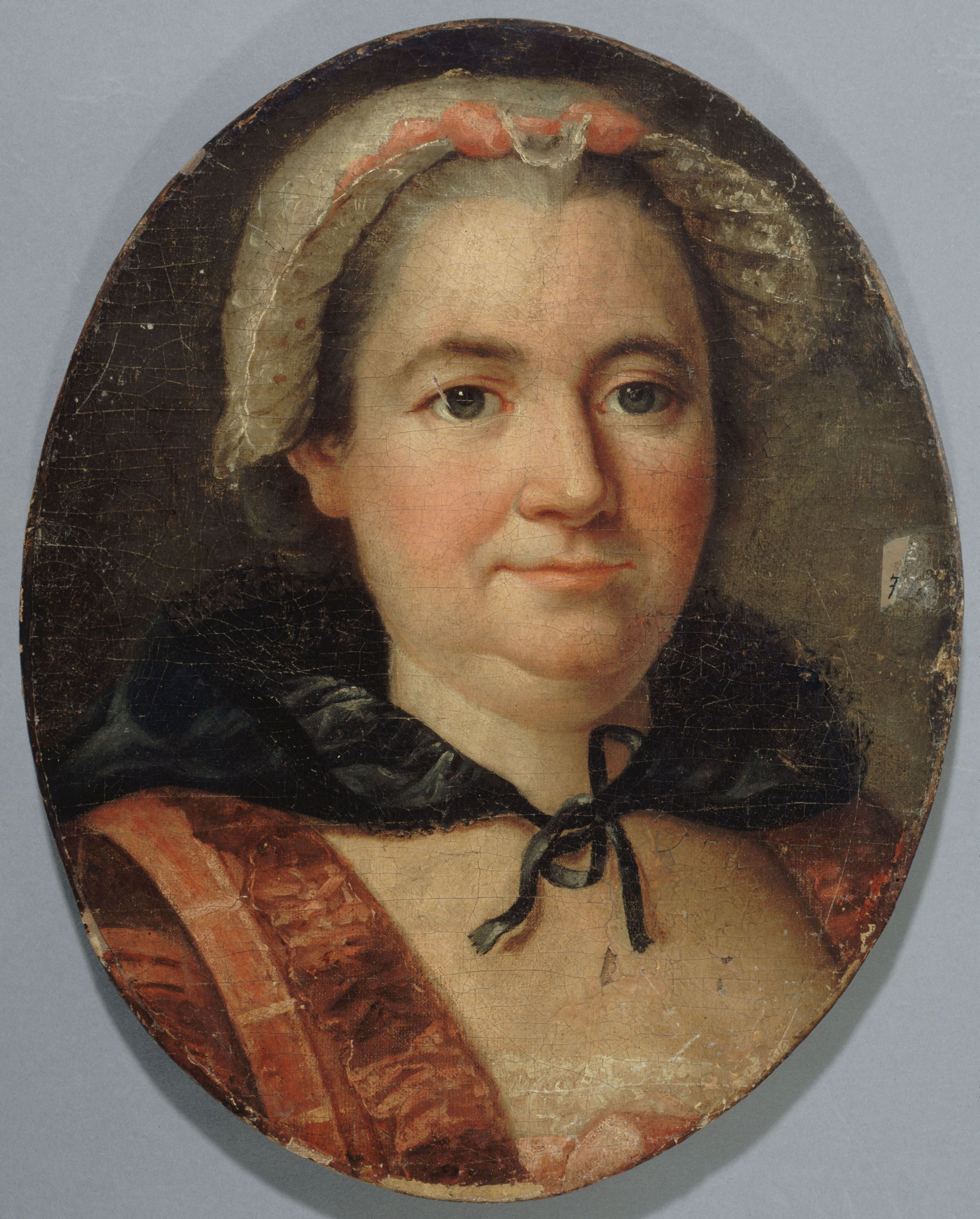
Françoise de Graffigny

- December 12 – Françoise de Graffigny, French lettrist (b. 1695)
- December 16 – Andrzej Stanisław Załuski, Polish-Lithuanian bishop (b. 1695)
- December 17 – Charles Butler, 1st Earl of Arran, Anglo-Irish noble (b. 1671)
- December 25 – James Hervey, English clergyman, writer (b. 1714)
- December 26 – François Joseph Lagrange-Chancel, French dramatist, satirist (b. 1677)
- François Mackandal, Haitian revolutionary leader, burned at the stake (b. c. 1730)
- Nathaniel Meserve, American shipwright (b. 1704)
- Hyder Ali and his Sepoy capture Bangalore from "Khande Rao of the Maratha Confederacy". (Part of the Seven Years' War).
- Verónica II Guterres, African monarch

1759

- January 12 – Anne, Princess Royal and Princess of Orange, regent of Friesland (b. 1709)
- February 9 – Louise Henriette of Bourbon, Duchess of Orléans, mother of Philippe Égalité (b. 1726)
- February 20 – Georg Anton Urlaub, German painter (b. 1713)
- February 27 – Jacob Theodor Klein, German scholar (b. 1685)
- March 11 – John Forbes, British general (b. 1707)
- April 6 – Johann Gottfried Zinn, German anatomist, botanist (b. 1727)

George Frideric Handel

- April 14 – George Frideric Handel, German composer (b. 1685)
- May 12 – Lambert-Sigisbert Adam, French sculptor (b. 1700)
- May 23 – Landgravine Eleonore of Hesse-Rotenburg, Countess (b. 1712)
- June 3 – Didier Diderot, French craftsman (b. 1685)
- June 20 – Margareta Capsia, Finnish artist (b. 1682)
- June 27 – Jacques Claude Marie Vincent de Gournay, French economist (b. 1712)
- July 6 – William Pepperrell, English colonial soldier (b. 1696)
- July 27 – Pierre Louis Moreau de Maupertuis, French mathematician (b. 1698)
- August 8 – Carl Heinrich Graun, German composer (b. 1704)
- August 10 – King Ferdinand VI of Spain (b. 1713)
- August 16 – Eugene Aram, English philologist and murderer, hanged (b. 1704)
- August 24 – Ewald Christian von Kleist, German poet (b. 1715)
- September 10 – Ferdinand Konščak, Croatian explorer (b. 1703)
- September 13 – James Wolfe, British general (b. 1727)
- September 14 – Louis-Joseph de Montcalm, French general (b. 1712)
- September 16 – Nicolas Antoine Boulanger, French philosopher (b. 1722)
- October 10 – Granville Elliott, Army General, British military expert, working for Britain and Palatine forces (b. 1713)
- October 27 – Konstancja Czartoryska, Polish noblewoman politician (b. 1700)
- November 14 – Grégoire Orlyk, Ukrainian-born French Lieutenant General (b. 1702)
- November 29 – Nicolaus I Bernoulli, Swiss mathematician (b. 1687)
- December 6 – Princess Louise-Élisabeth of France, daughter of King Louis XV (b. 1727)
- date unknown
  - Alberto Pullicino, Maltese painter (b. 1719)
  - King Thipchang of the Realm of Lampang (b. c. 1675)
