= 1695 =

1695 in various calendars
- Gregorian calendar: 1695; MDCXCV
- Ab urbe condita: 2448
- Armenian calendar: 1144; ԹՎ ՌՃԽԴ
- Assyrian calendar: 6445
- Balinese saka calendar: 1616–1617
- Bengali calendar: 1101–1102
- Berber calendar: 2645
- English Regnal year: 7 Will. & Mar. – 8 Will. 3
- Buddhist calendar: 2239
- Burmese calendar: 1057
- Byzantine calendar: 7203–7204
- Chinese calendar: 甲戌年 (Wood Dog); 4392 or 4185 — to — 乙亥年 (Wood Pig); 4393 or 4186
- Coptic calendar: 1411–1412
- Discordian calendar: 2861
- Ethiopian calendar: 1687–1688
- Hebrew calendar: 5455–5456
- Hindu calendars
- Vikram Samvat: 1751–1752
- Shaka Samvat: 1616–1617
- Kali Yuga: 4795–4796
- Holocene calendar: 11695
- Igbo calendar: 695–696
- Iranian calendar: 1073–1074
- Islamic calendar: 1106–1107
- Japanese calendar: Genroku 8 (元禄８年)
- Javanese calendar: 1618–1619
- Julian calendar: Gregorian minus 10 days
- Korean calendar: 4028
- Minguo calendar: 217 before ROC 民前217年
- Nanakshahi calendar: 227
- Thai solar calendar: 2237–2238
- Tibetan calendar: ཤིང་ཕོ་ཁྱི་ལོ་ (male Wood-Dog); 1821 or 1440 or 668 — to — ཤིང་མོ་ཕག་ལོ་ (female Wood-Boar); 1822 or 1441 or 669

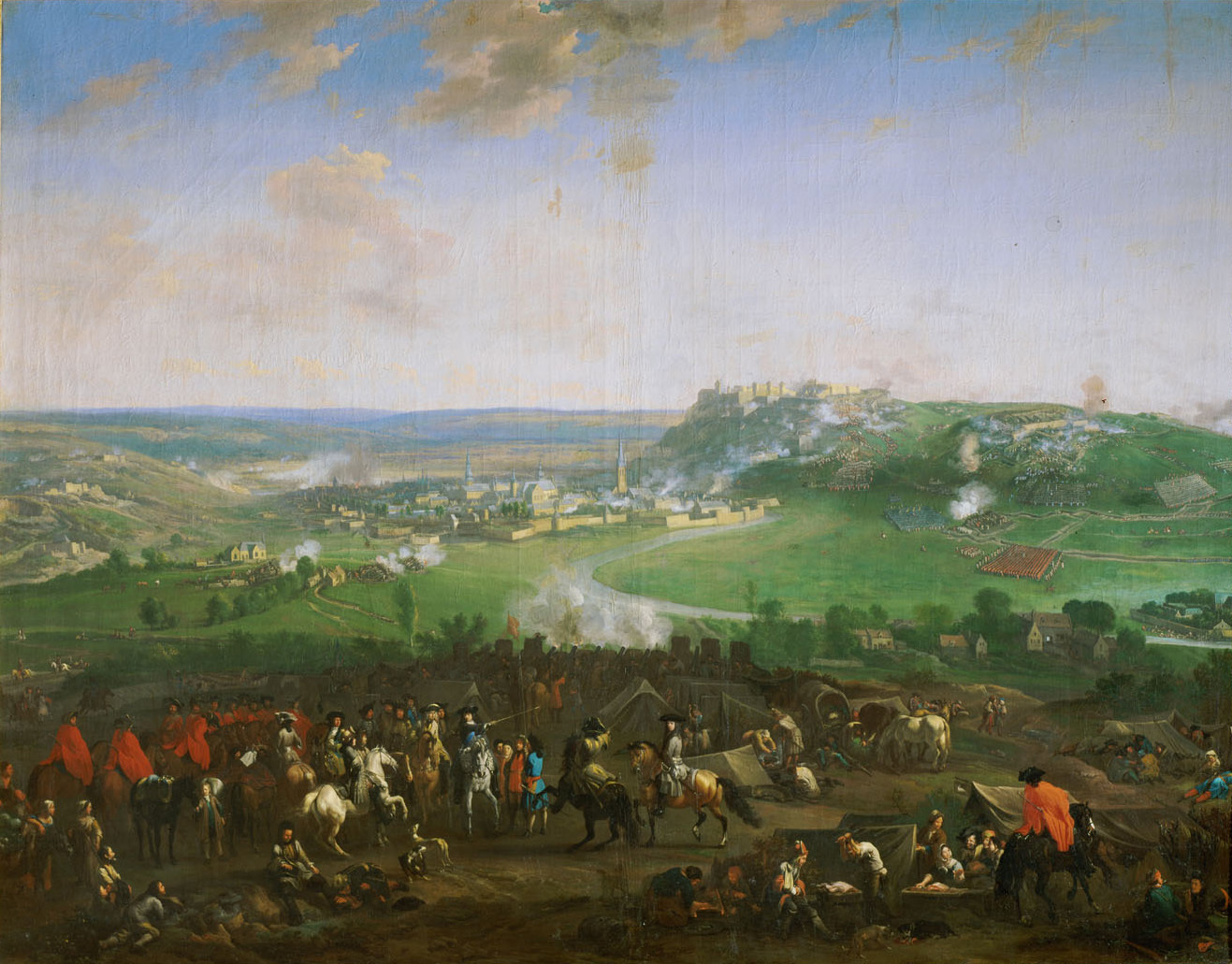
July 12: The Siege of Namur begins in Belgium.

1695 (MDCXCV) was a common year starting on Saturday of the Gregorian calendar and a common year starting on Tuesday of the Julian calendar, the 1695th year of the Common Era (CE) and Anno Domini (AD) designations, the 695th year of the 2nd millennium, the 95th year of the 17th century, and the 6th year of the 1690s decade. As of the start of 1695, the Gregorian calendar was 10 days ahead of the Julian calendar, which remained in localized use until 1923.

== Events ==
=== January–March ===
- January 7 (December 28, 1694 O.S.) – The United Kingdom's last joint monarchy, the reign of husband-and-wife King William III and Queen Mary II comes to an end with the death of Queen Mary, at the age of 32. Princess Mary had been installed as the monarch along with her husband and cousin, Willem Hendrik von Oranje, Stadtholder of the Dutch Republic, in 1689 after King James II was deposed by Willem during the "Glorious Revolution".
- January 14 (January 4 O.S.) – The Royal Navy warship HMS Nonsuch is captured near England's Isles of Scilly by the 48-gun French privateer Le Francois. Nonsuch is then sold to the French Navy and renamed Le Sans Pareil.
- January 24 – Milan's Court Theater is destroyed in a fire.
- January 27 – A flotilla of six Royal Navy warships under the command of Commodore James Killegrew aboard HMS Plymouth captures two French warships, the Content and the Trident, the day after the French ships had mistaken the English fleet to be a group of merchant ships to attack.
- February 6 – Mustafa II (1664 – 1703) succeeds his uncle, Ahmed II as Sultan of the Ottoman Empire.
- March 5 – The funeral of Queen Mary II of England takes place, accompanied by music written for the occasion by Henry Purcell.
- March 7 – John Trevor, Speaker of the English House of Commons, is expelled from the House by vote of the members, after being found guilty of accepting a bribe of 1000 pounds sterling from the City of London Corporation.
- March 10 – Almost all French Army soldiers in a column of 1,300 troops, commanded by Brigadier General Urbain Le Clerc de Juigné, are killed or captured in the Battle of Sant Esteve d'en Bas against a smaller Spanish Empire force led by Ramon de Sala i Saçala during the War of the Grand Alliance.
- March 14 – Paul Foley is elected as the new Speaker of the House after the expulsion of John Trevor.
- March 26 – John Hungerford is expelled from the English House of Commons when members vote to find him guilty of accepting a bribe in return for using his committee chairmanship to promote the pending Orphans Bill.

=== April–June ===
- April 17 – The House of Commons of England decides not to renew the Licensing Order of 1643, and states its reasoning, beginning with "Because it revives, and re-enacts, a Law which in no-wise answered the End for which it was made". The lifting of censorship creates a more open society, and an explosion of print results. Within 30 years, the number of printing houses in England increases from 20 to 103.
- April 22 – Sürmeli Ali Pasha is fired from his position as Grand Vizier of the Ottoman Empire, after coming into a disagreement with the new Sultan, Mustafa II. Sürmeli is initially sent into exile, but executed on the Sultan's orders on May 29.
- April 27 – Russo-Turkish War (1686–1700): Russia begins the Azov campaigns (1695–96) against the Ottoman Empire, with 31,000 troops departing to the Ottoman fortress at Azov on the Don River.
- May 18 – The 7.8 magnitude Linfen earthquake in Shanxi Province, Qing Dynasty kills over 50,000 people.
- June 11 – An annular eclipse of the sun is visible across South America.
- June 24 – The Commission of Enquiry into the Massacre of Glencoe in Scotland in 1692 reports to the Parliament of England, blaming Sir John Dalrymple, Secretary of State over Scotland, and declares that a soldier should refuse to obey a "command against the law of nature".

=== July–September ===
- July 12 – The Siege of Namur begins in the Spanish Netherlands (now Belgium).
- July 15 – The siege of the Ottoman fortress at Azaq by the Russian Army begins, but is unsuccessful and is discontinued after October 2 (September 22 O.S.).
- July 17 – The Bank of Scotland is founded.
- August 8 – The Wren Building is started in Williamsburg, Virginia (completed in 1700).
- August 10 – A naval skirmish occurs between English and Swedish ships in the Strait of Dover
- August 13–15 – Nine Years' War: Brussels is bombarded by French troops.
- September 1 – Nine Years' War: France surrenders Namur, Spanish Netherlands to forces of the Grand Alliance, led by King William III of England, Stadtholder of the Dutch Republic, following the 2-month Siege of Namur.
- September 7 – English pirate Henry Every perpetrates one of the most profitable raids in history, with the capture of the Grand Mughal ship Ganj-i-Sawai. In response, Emperor Aurangzeb threatens to put an end to all English trading in India.
- September 24 – All but eight of the remaining 305 crew of the Royal Navy ship HMS Winchester (1693) are killed when the ship founders in the Florida Keys. According to the ship's logbook, an epidemic of yellow fever began on August 1 and had killed 45 people before the hurricane struck, and left all but seven crew members too ill to walk.

=== October–December ===
- October 11 – King William III of England dissolves Parliament in the wake of a scandal involving former Speaker of the House of Commons John Trevor and other Tory MPs.
- October 25 – The 48-gun English Navy ship HMS Berkeley Castle is captured by the French Navy.
- November 22 – The new Parliament, with 513 members of the House of Commons is opened by King William III. Commons is composed of 257 Whigs (who hold a majority of one), 203 Tories and 53 members of other parties or independents.
- December 6 – A total eclipse of the sun is visible across the Middle East and western Asia.
- December 31 – A window tax is imposed in England. Some windows are bricked up to avoid it.

=== Date unknown ===
- English manufacturers call for an embargo on Indian cloth, and silk weavers picket the House of Commons of England.
- A £2 fine is imposed for swearing in England.
- After 23 years of construction, Spain completes Castillo de San Marcos to protect St. Augustine, Florida, from foreign threats.
- After many years of construction, the Potala Palace in Lhasa is completed.
- Gold is discovered in Brazil.
- Johanne Nielsdatter is executed for witchcraft, the last such confirmed execution in Norway.
- In Amsterdam, the bank Wed. Jean Deutz & Sn. floats the first sovereign bonds on the local market. The scheme is designed to fund a 1.5 million guilder loan to the Holy Roman Emperor. From this date on, European leaders commonly take advantage of the low interest rates available in the Dutch Republic, and borrow several hundred millions on the Dutch capital market.
- A large unidentified tropical volcanic eruption causes colder temperatures, crop failure, food shortage and mortality in north-western Europe.
- A naval skirmish occurs between English and Swedish ships en-route to Portugal.
- The Great Famine of 1695–1697 begins as the Great Famine of Estonia (1695–97) in Swedish Estonia and spreads across Finland, Latvia, Norway and Sweden, while the "seven ill years" of famine in Scotland are ongoing.

== Births ==
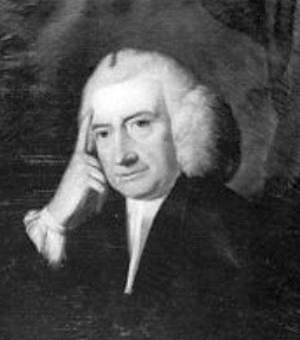
William Borlase born 2 February

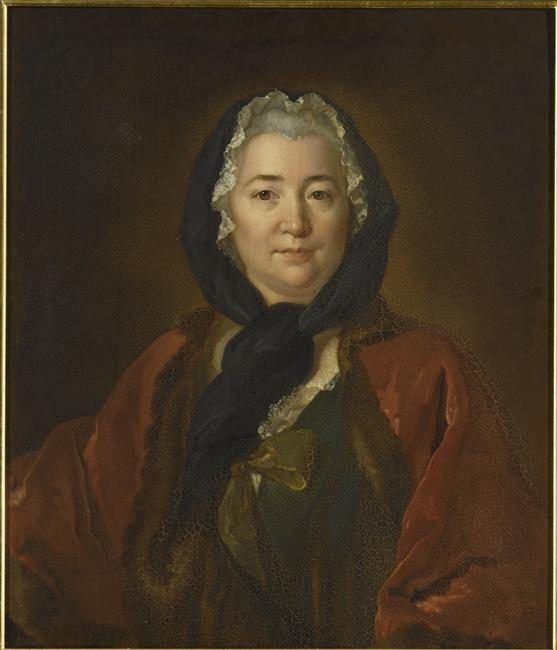
Françoise de Graffigny born 11 February

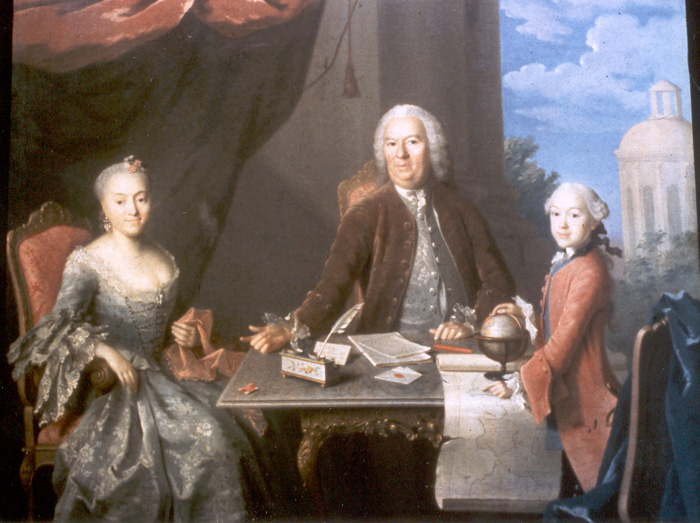
Abraham Pelt born 11 February

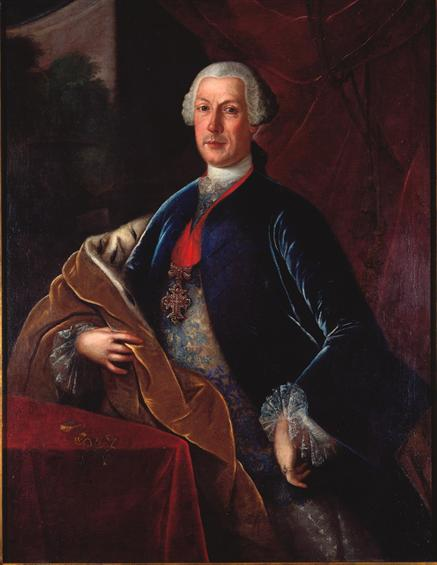
Infante António of Portugal born 15 March

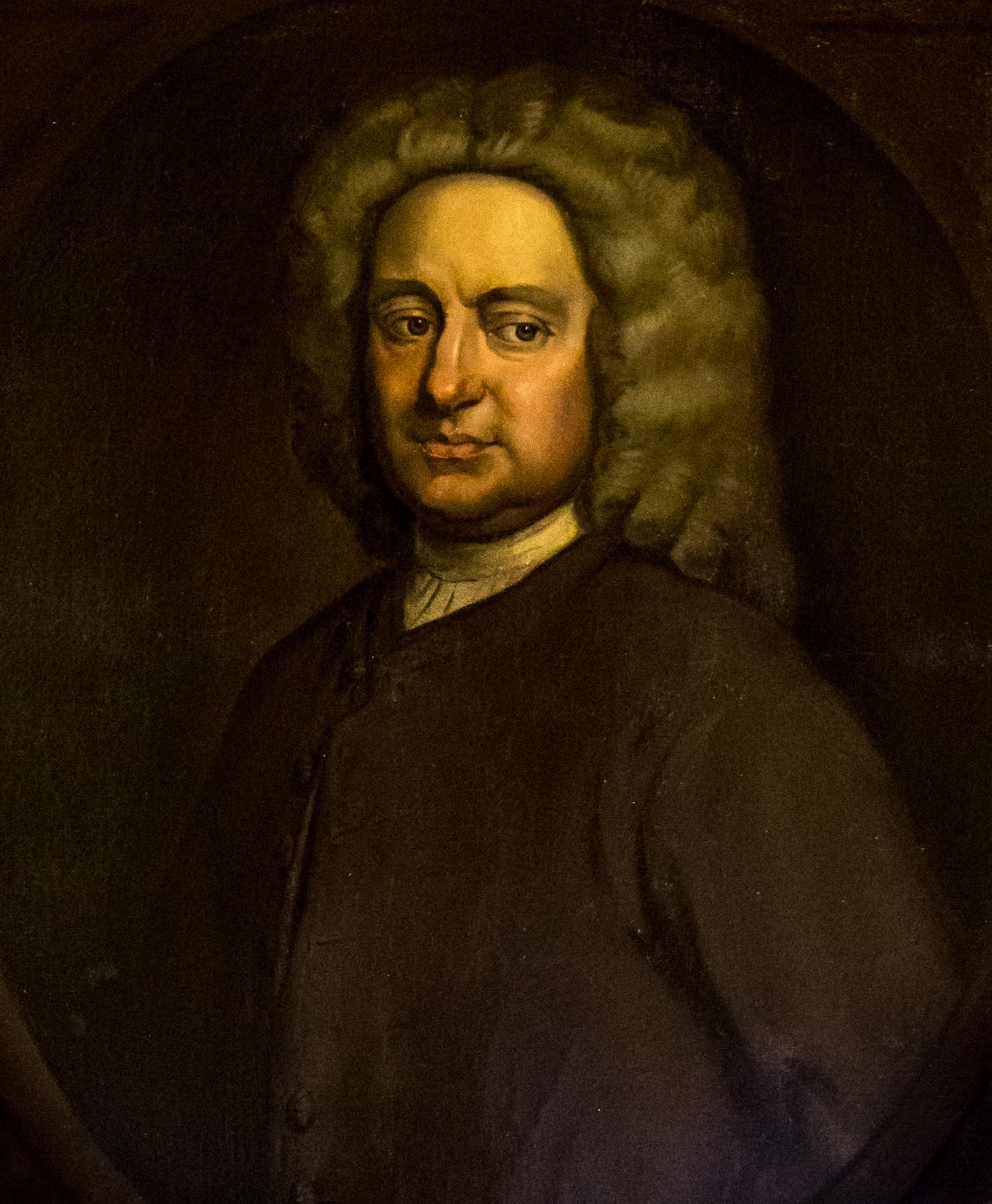
William Greene (colonial governor) born 16 March

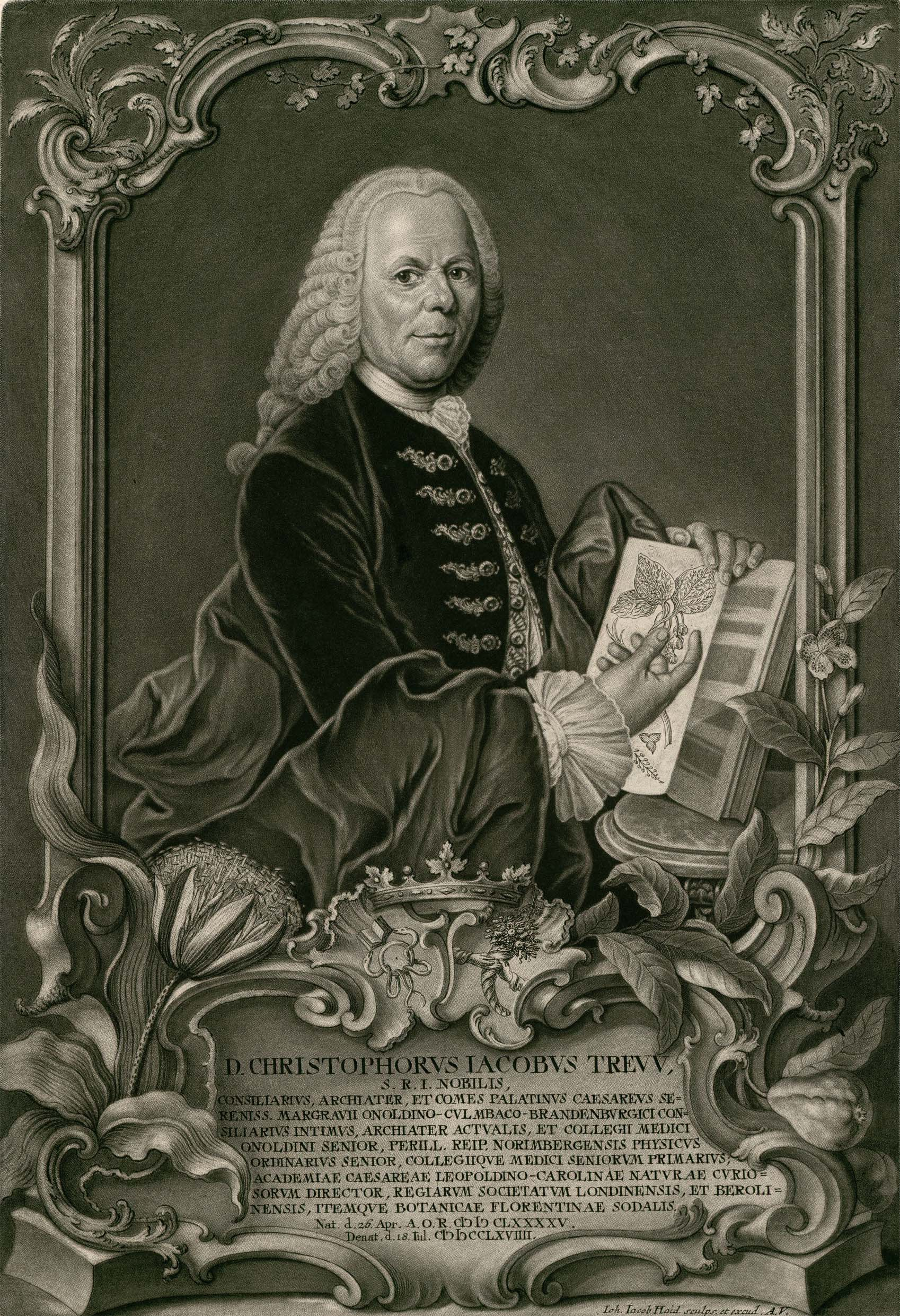
Christoph Jacob Trew born 16 April

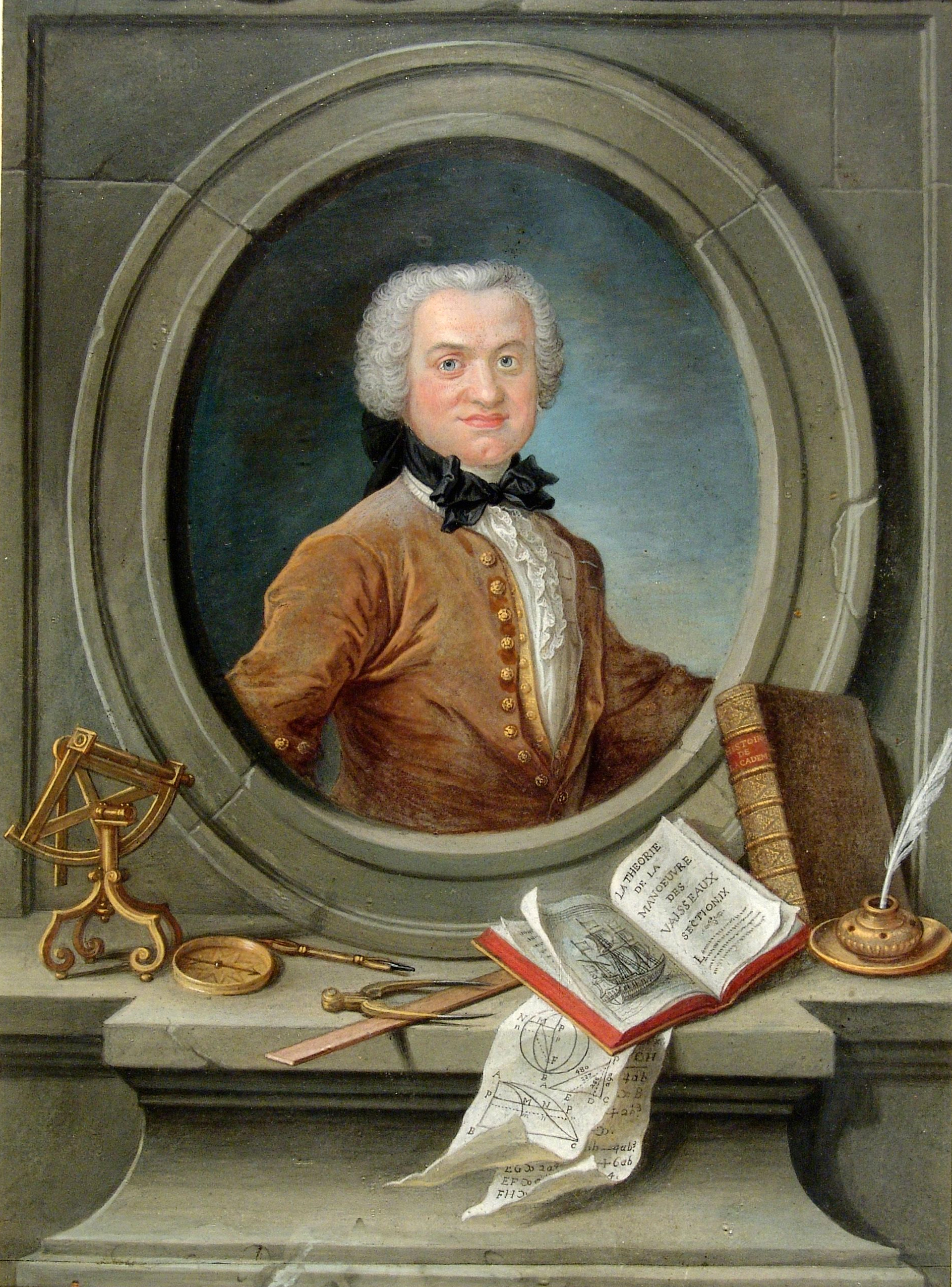
Henri Pitot born 3 May

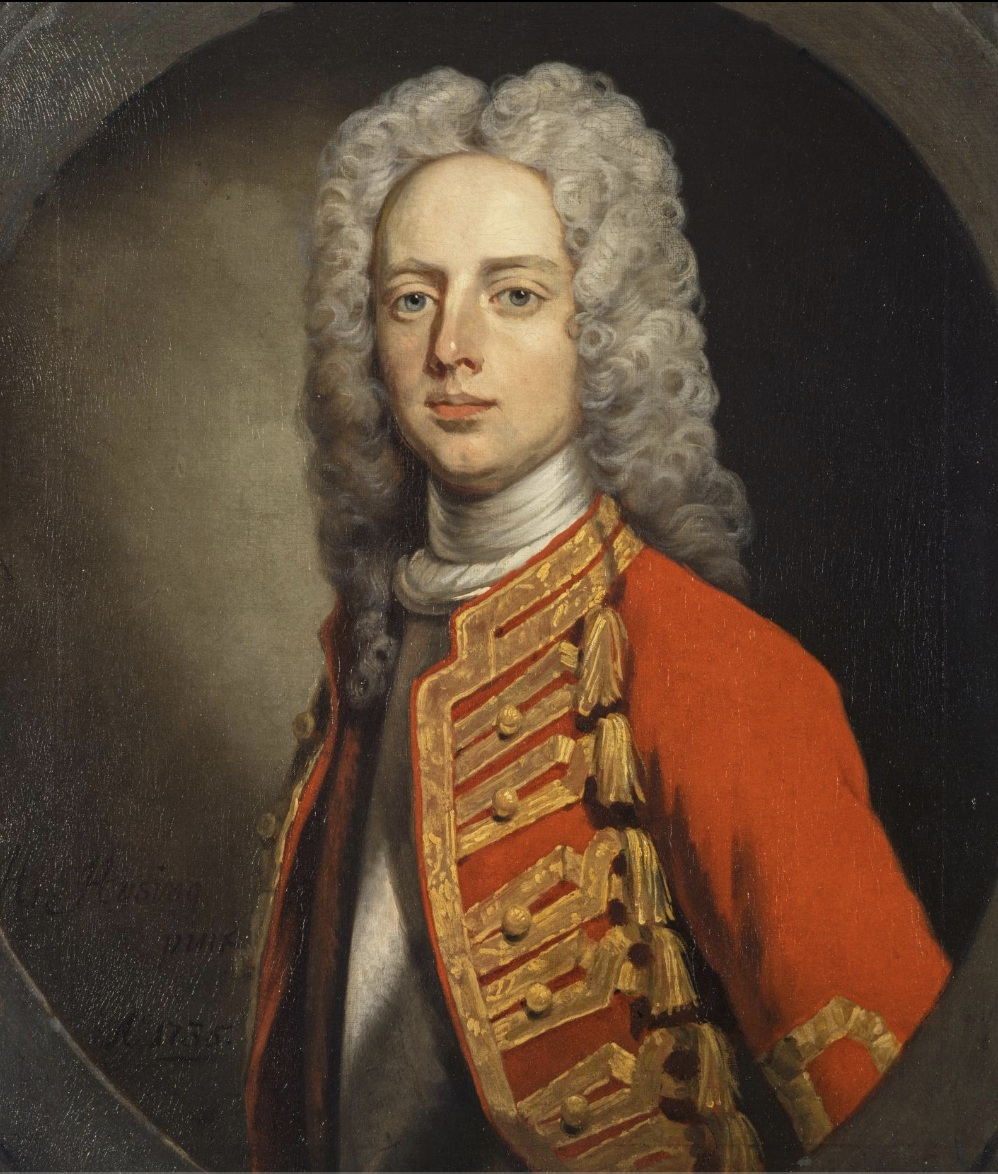
Sir Peter Halkett, 2nd Baronet born 21 June

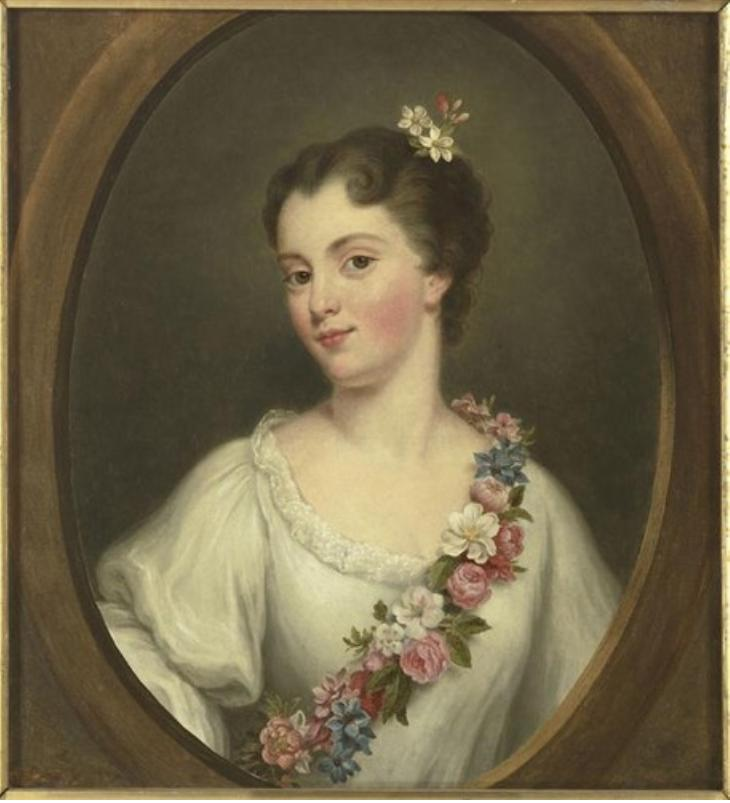
Louise Anne de Bourbon born 23 June

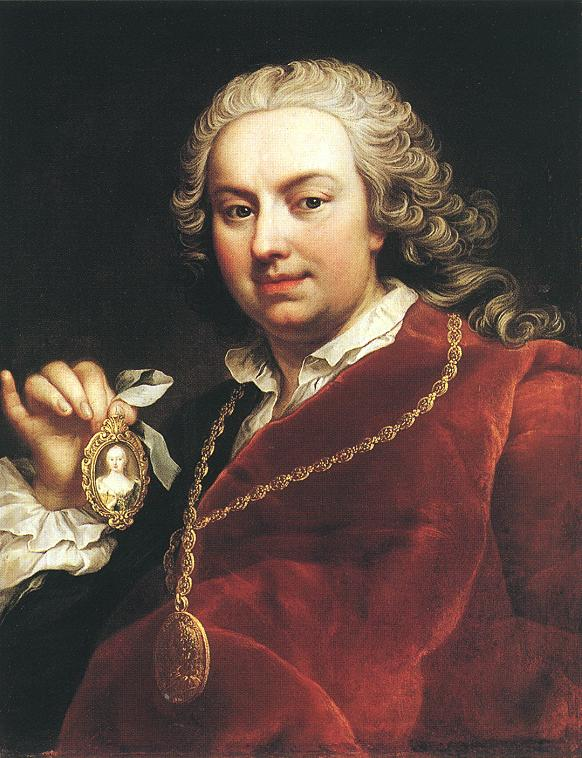
Martin van Meytens born 24 June

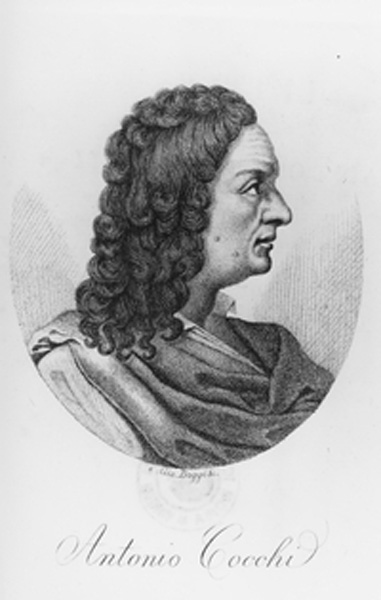
Antonio Cocchi born 3 August

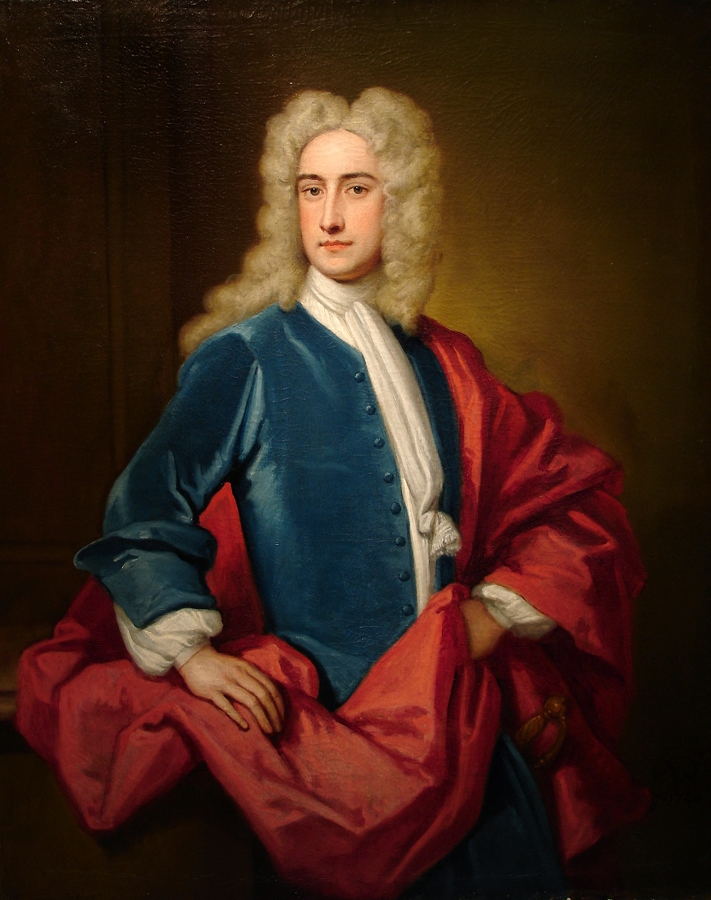
Samuel Sandys, 1st Baron Sandys born 10 August

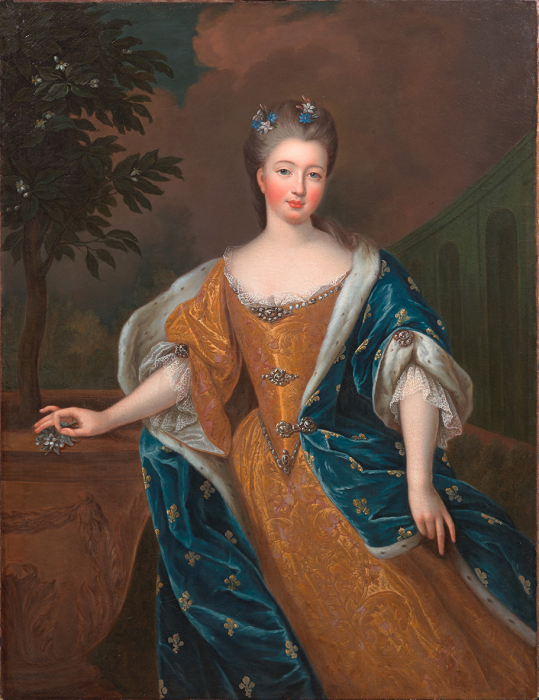
Marie Louise Élisabeth d'Orléans born 20 August

=== January–March ===
- January 2 – Sir Robert Cotton, 3rd Baronet, British politician (d. 1748)
- January 6 – Giuseppe Sammartini, Italian composer and oboist (d. 1750)
- January 9 – Ferdinand Ashmall, British clergy (d. 1798)
- January 18 – Paul Bécart de Granville et de Fonville, French colonial officer (d. 1754)
- January 25
  - Prince Francis Ernest of Hesse-Darmstadt, German aristocrat (d. 1716)
  - Satake Yoshitada (d. 1715), Japanese daimyō
- January 26 – José Quer y Martínez, Spanish botanist (d. 1764)
- January 27 – Anne Howard, Countess of Effingham, British countess (d. 1774)
- February 2
  - William Borlase, English antiquarian, geologist and naturalist (d. 1772)
  - François de Chevert, French general (d. 1769)
  - Christoph Sauer, German-American printer and publisher (d. 1757)
- February 6 – Nicolaus II Bernoulli, Russian mathematician (d. 1726)
- February 10 – Armand Jules de Rohan-Guéméné, French archbishop (d. 1762)
- February 11
  - Françoise de Graffigny, French writer (d. 1758)
  - Abraham Pelt, Danish industrialist and philanthropist (d. 1783)
- February 13 – Francesco Maria Della Rovere, politician (d. 1768)
- February 14 – Joseph Anton Glantschnigg, painter of German origin (d. 1755)
- February 16 – Philippe-Claude de Montboissier de Beaufort, French politician (d. 1765)
- February 21 – Anthony Grey, Earl of Harold, English noble (d. 1723)
- March 2 – Bernhard Christoph Breitkopf, German music publisher (d. 1777)
- March 3 – María Anna Águeda de San Ignacio, Mexican writer (d. 1756)
- March 4 – Marie Huber, Genevan writer and theologian (d. 1753)
- March 9 – Martín Sarmiento, Spanish scholar and writer (d. 1772)
- March 10 – Adrien Manglard, French painter and engraver (d. 1760)
- March 12 – Mihael Summa, Albanian clergyman and auxiliary bishop (d. 1777)
- March 13 – Daniel Overbeek, Dutch colonial governor (d. 1751)
- March 15
  - Infante António of Portugal, Portuguese infante (d. 1757)
  - Alexander Joseph Sulkowski, Polish and Saxon general (d. 1762)
- March 16
  - Christian Hilfgott Brand, German Austrian painter (d. 1756)
  - William Greene, Governor of the Colony of Rhode Island and Providence Plantations (d. 1758)
- March 19
  - William Noel, English barrister, judge and politician, (d. 1762)
  - Christian Seybold, German painter (d. 1768)
- March 20 – Toki Yoritoshi, Daimyo in the Tokugawa shogunate (d. 1744)
- March 27 – Johann Philipp Anton von Franckenstein, German priest (d. 1753)

=== April–June ===
- April 8 – Johann Christian Günther, German poet (d. 1723)
- April 14 – Pietro Guarneri, Italian luthier (d. 1762)
- April 16 – Christoph Jacob Trew, German physician and botanist (d. 1769)
- April 17 – Ludovico Valenti, Italian cardinal (d. 1763)
- April 19
  - Roger Morris, English architect (d. 1749)
  - Georg Albrecht of Saxe-Weissenfels, Count of Barby, German noble, Count of Barby (d. 1739)
- May 1 – Pierre Saint-Sevin, French composer (d. 1768)
- May 2 – Giovanni Niccolò Servandoni, French architect and painter (d. 1766)
- May 3
  - Pacifico Bizza, Roman Catholic archbishop (d. 1756)
  - Henri Pitot, French hydraulic engineer (d. 1771)
- May 6 – Isaac Wilkinson, English businessman (d. 1784)
- May 7
  - Sir Robert Grosvenor, 6th Baronet, British politician (d. 1755)
  - Gabriel Huquier, French art dealer (d. 1772)
- May 8 – John Lee, British politician (d. 1761)
- May 16 – Louis-Urbain-Aubert de Tourny, French intendant (d. 1760)
- May 22 – Anna Folkema, Engraver from the Northern Netherlands (d. 1768)
- May 27 – Miguel Cabrera, Mexican painter (d. 1768)
- May 28 – Alexander Leslie, 5th Earl of Leven, British politician (d. 1754)
- June 3 – Francis Wise, Keeper of the archive at the University of Oxford (d. 1767)
- June 5 – Johann Conrad Schlaun, German architect (d. 1773)
- June 6 – Adriaan Valckenier, Dutch Governor-General of the Dutch East Indies (1737-1741) (d. 1751)
- June 14 – Johann Friedrich Walther, German teacher, organist and draughtsman (d. 1776)
- June 17 – Henri-Michel Guedier de Saint-Aubin, French theologist (d. 1741)
- June 21
  - Joseph Banks, English landowner and MP (d. 1741)
  - Sir Peter Halkett, 2nd Baronet, politician (d. 1755)
- June 23 – Louise Anne de Bourbon, French princess, the daughter of Louis III de Bourbon (d. 1758)
- June 24 – Martin van Meytens, Austrian artist (d. 1770)
- June 28 – Christiana Mariana von Ziegler, German poet (d. 1760)

=== July–September ===
- July 2
  - Sir Orlando Bridgeman, 4th Baronet, British politician 1695–1764 (d. 1764)
  - Louis Charles César Le Tellier, French military commander and Marshal of France (d. 1771)
- July 6 – Giovanni Francesco II Brignole Sale, Italian politician (d. 1760)
- July 17
  - Alexandre de Gusmão, Portuguese diplomat (d. 1753)
  - Christian Karl Reinhard of Leiningen-Dagsburg-Falkenburg, Count of Leiningen-Dagsburg (d. 1766)
  - Alexander Moncrieff, Scottish minister of the Secession church (d. 1761)
- July 18 – Boris Grigoryevich Yusupov, Russian politician (d. 1759)
- July 21 – Thomas Archer, 1st Baron Archer, British politician (d. 1768)
- July 28 – Yunlu, prince Zhuang of the First Rank (d. 1767)
- July 30 – Charles Philippe d'Albert de Luynes, French noble (d. 1758)
- August 1 – John Rutherford, Scottish physician (d. 1779)
- August 3 – Antonio Cocchi, Italian physician and naturalist (d. 1758)
- August 9 – Andreas Murray, Swedish priest (d. 1771)
- August 10 – Samuel Sandys, 1st Baron Sandys, British politician (d. 1770)
- August 11 – Michelangelo Unterberger, Austrian painter (d. 1758)
- August 14 – Mikołaj Krzysztof Radziwiłł, Lithuanian–Polish noble (d. 1715)
- August 17 – Gustaf Lundberg, Swedish rococo painter (d. 1786)
- August 20 – Marie Louise Élisabeth d'Orléans, French princess (d. 1719)
- August 26 – Marie-Anne-Catherine Quinault, French opera singer and composer (d. 1791)
- August 31 – Maximilian, Prince of Hornes, prince (d. 1763)
- September 3 – Pietro Locatelli, Italian Baroque composer and violinist (d. 1764)
- September 5 – Carl Gustaf Tessin, Swedish count, politician and art collector (d. 1770)
- September 6 – Charles Pole, British businessman and politician (d. 1779)
- September 7 – François Hus, French comedian (d. 1774)
- September 10 – Johann Lorenz Bach, German composer (d. 1773)
- September 15 – Michel Lullin de Chateauvieux, Genevan agronomist (d. 1781)
- September 21 – Ferdinando Colonna of Stigliano, 2nd Prince of Sonnino (d. 1775)
- September 22 – Mathias Chardon, French historian (d. 1771)
- September 27 – Anders Anton von Stiernman, Swedish historian (d. 1765)

=== October–December ===
- October 5 – John Glas, Scottish theologian (d. 1773)
- October 23 – François de Cuvilliés, Bavarian architect (d. 1768)
- October 31 – Nicolas-Joseph de Noyelles de Fleurimont, French soldier (d. 1761)
- November 1 – Pablo Maroni, Austrian missionary (d. 1757)
- November 4
  - John Erskine of Carnock, Scottish legal scholar (d. 1768)
  - Fabrizio Serbelloni, Catholic cardinal (d. 1775)
- November 9 – Theodosia Bligh, 10th Baroness Clifton, English peer, born Theodosia Hyde (d. 1722)
- November 10 – John Bevis, English physician and astronomer (d. 1771)
- November 17 – Barthold Douma van Burmania, Dutch diplomat (d. 1766)
- December 1 – Francesco Saverio Quadrio, Italian scholar (d. 1756)
- December 2 – Andrzej Stanisław Załuski, Polish bishop (d. 1758)
- December 11 – Charles Guillaume Loys de Bochat, jurist (d. 1754)
- December 12 – Michael Christoph Hanow, German historian and scientist (d. 1773)
- December 15 – Benigna Marie of Reuss-Ebersdorf, German noblewoman and author of hymns (d. 1751)
- December 18 – David Nitschmann der Bischof, bishop (d. 1772)
- December 19
  - Andrea Locatelli, Italian painter (d. 1741)
  - Joseph Gascoigne Nightingale, British Member of Parliament (d. 1752)
  - Jacob de Wit, Dutch painter (d. 1754)
- December 22 – Rebecca Kellogg Ashley, captive of Native Americans (d. 1757)
- December 26 – Johann Caspar Bachofen, Swiss composer (d. 1755)
- December 29 – Jean-Baptiste Pater, French painter (d. 1736)
- date unknown – Hedvig Catharina De la Gardie, Swedish salonnière (d. 1745)
  - Cai Wan, politically influential Chinese poet (d. 1755)

== Deaths ==
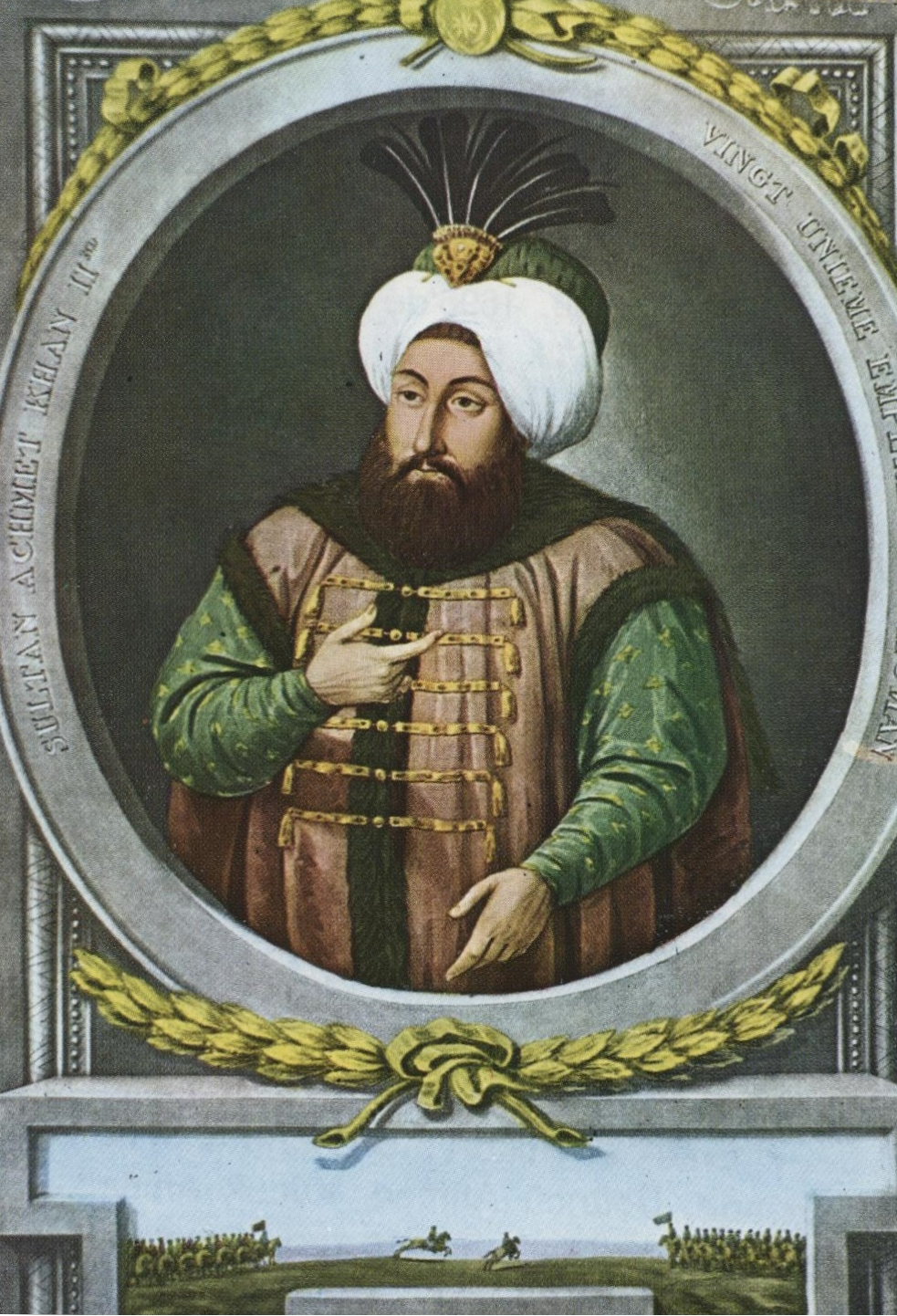
Ahmed II died 6 February

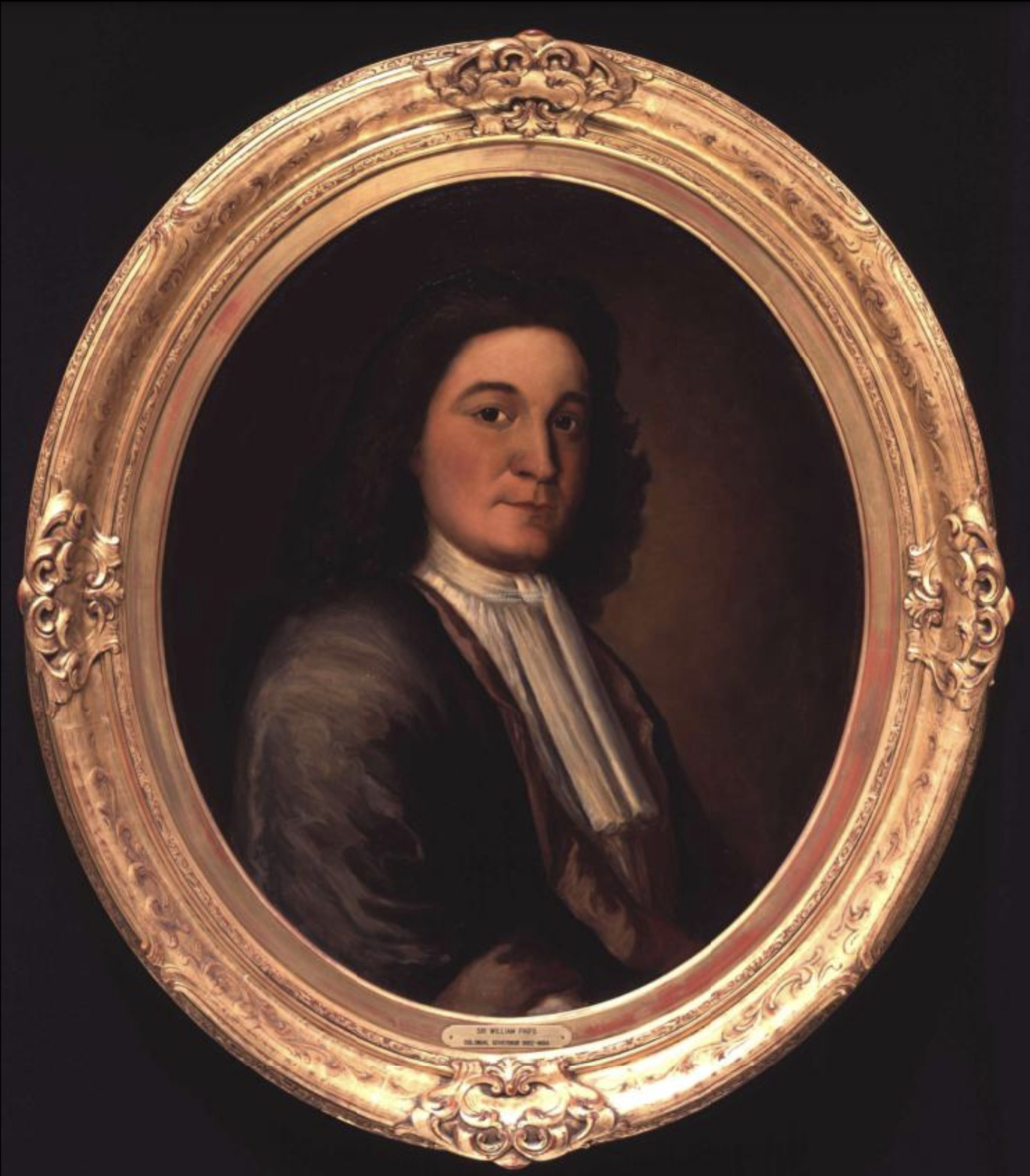
William Phips died 18 February

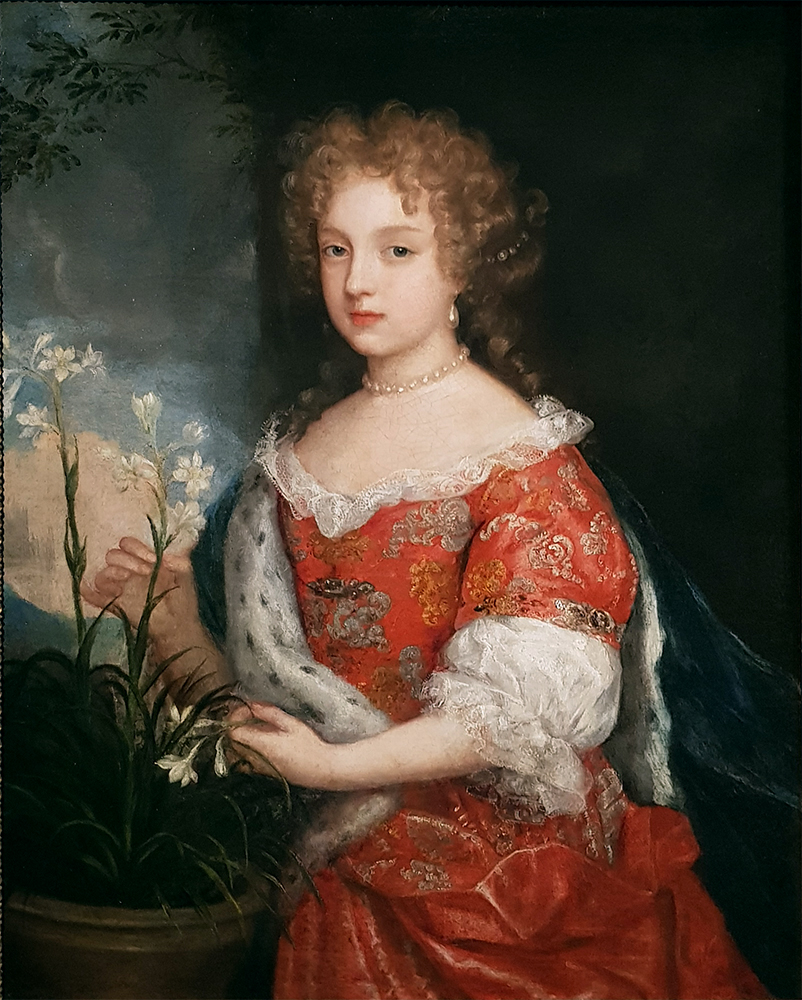
Ludwika Karolina Radziwiłł died 25 March

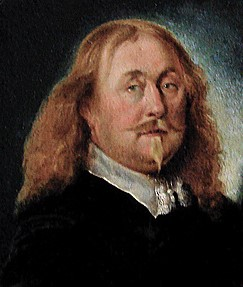
Lambert van Haven died 9 May

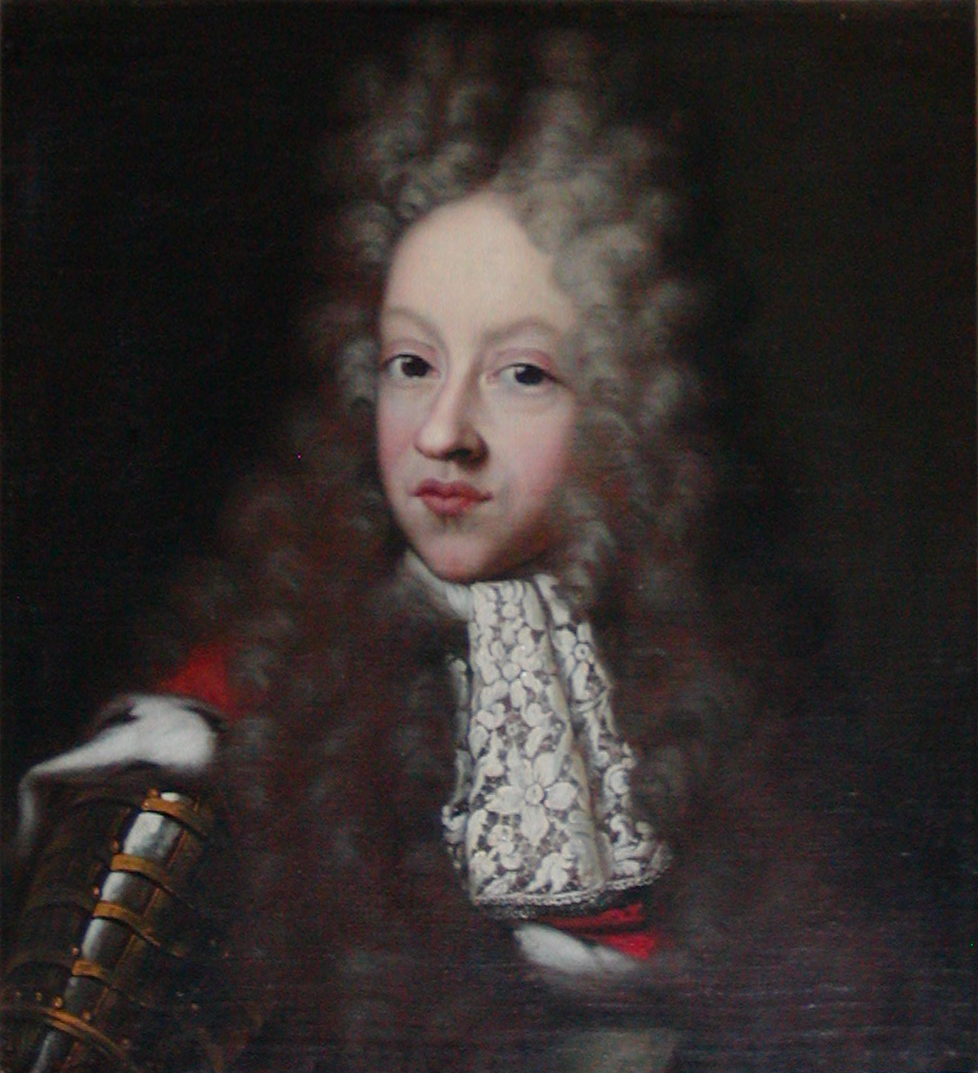
Prince Christian of Denmark (1675–1695) died 27 June

Christiaan Huygens died 8 July

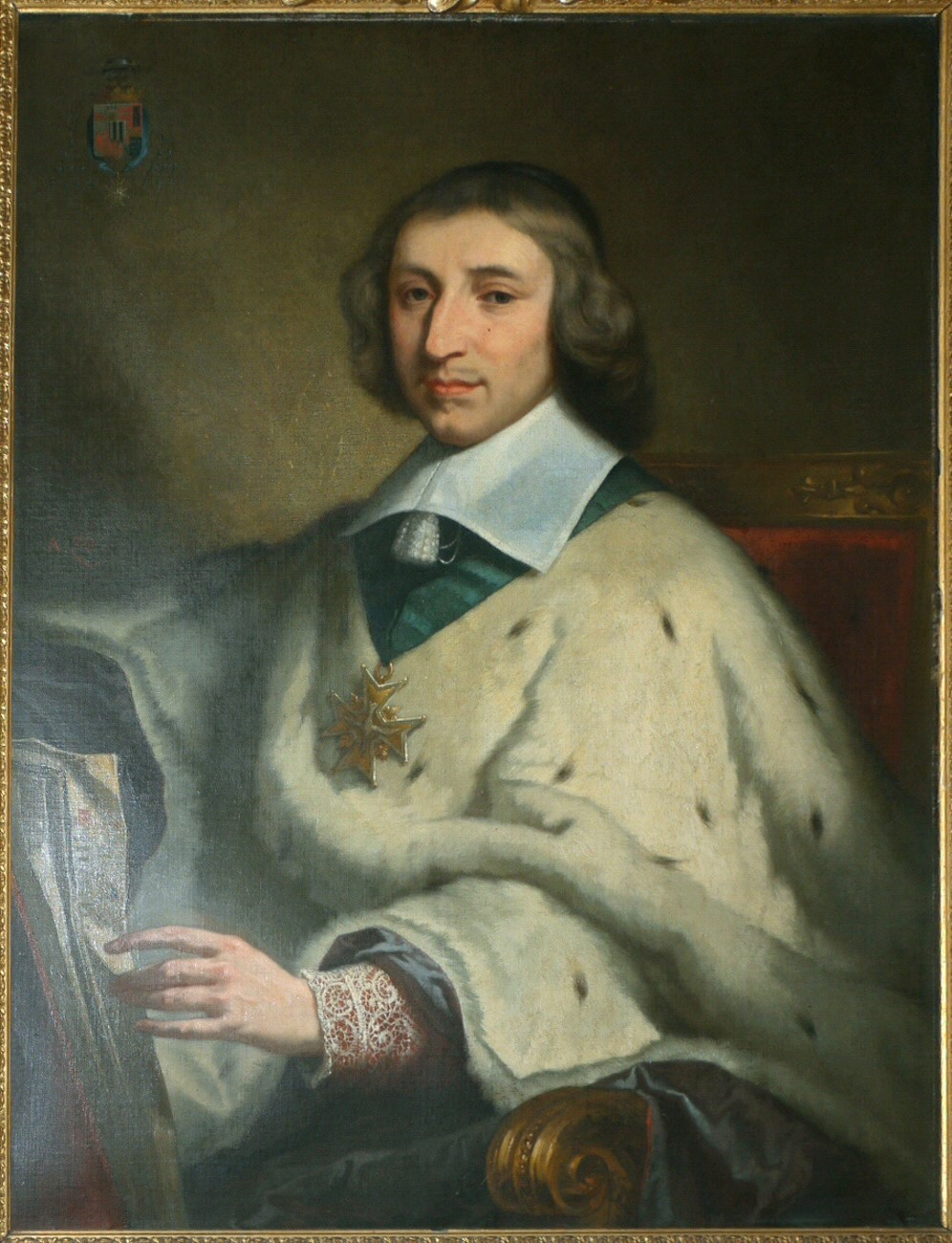
François de Harlay de Champvallon died 6 August

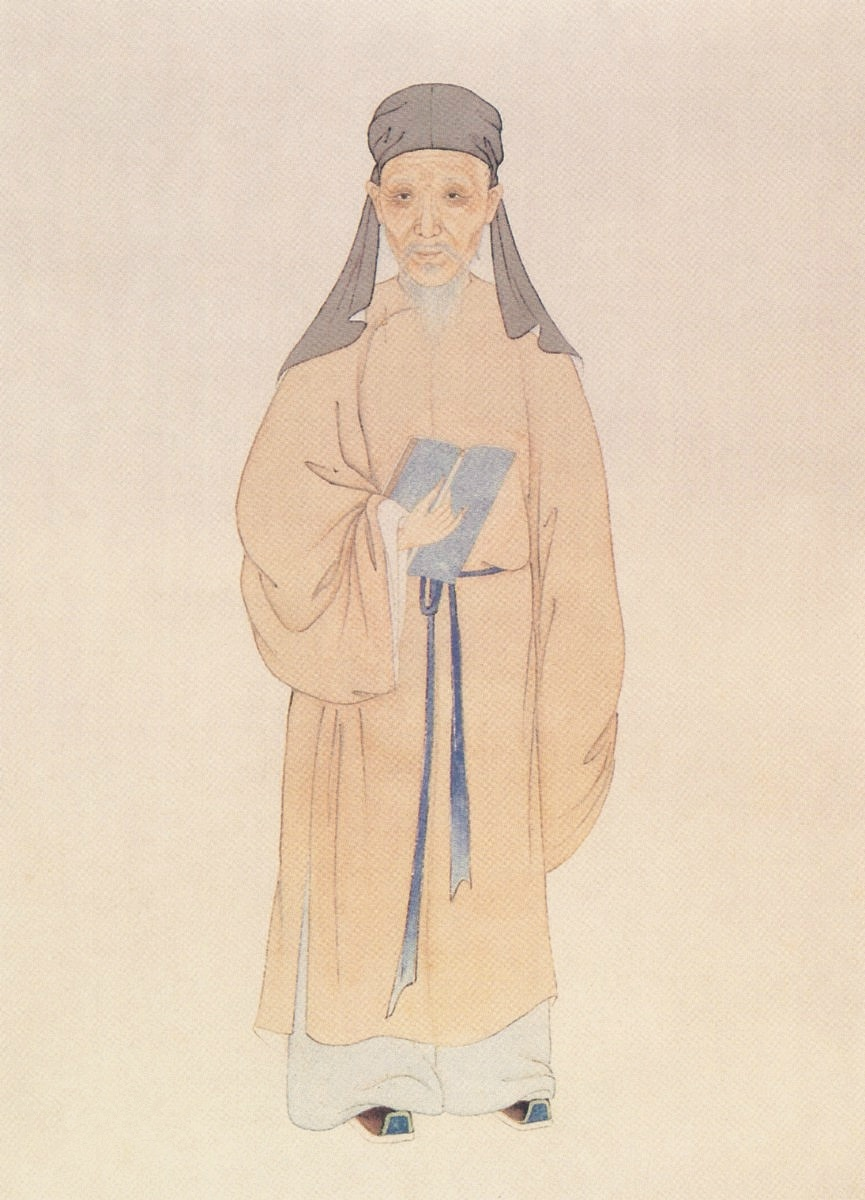
Huang Zongxi died 12 August

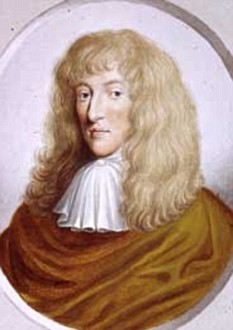
Christopher Merret died 19 August

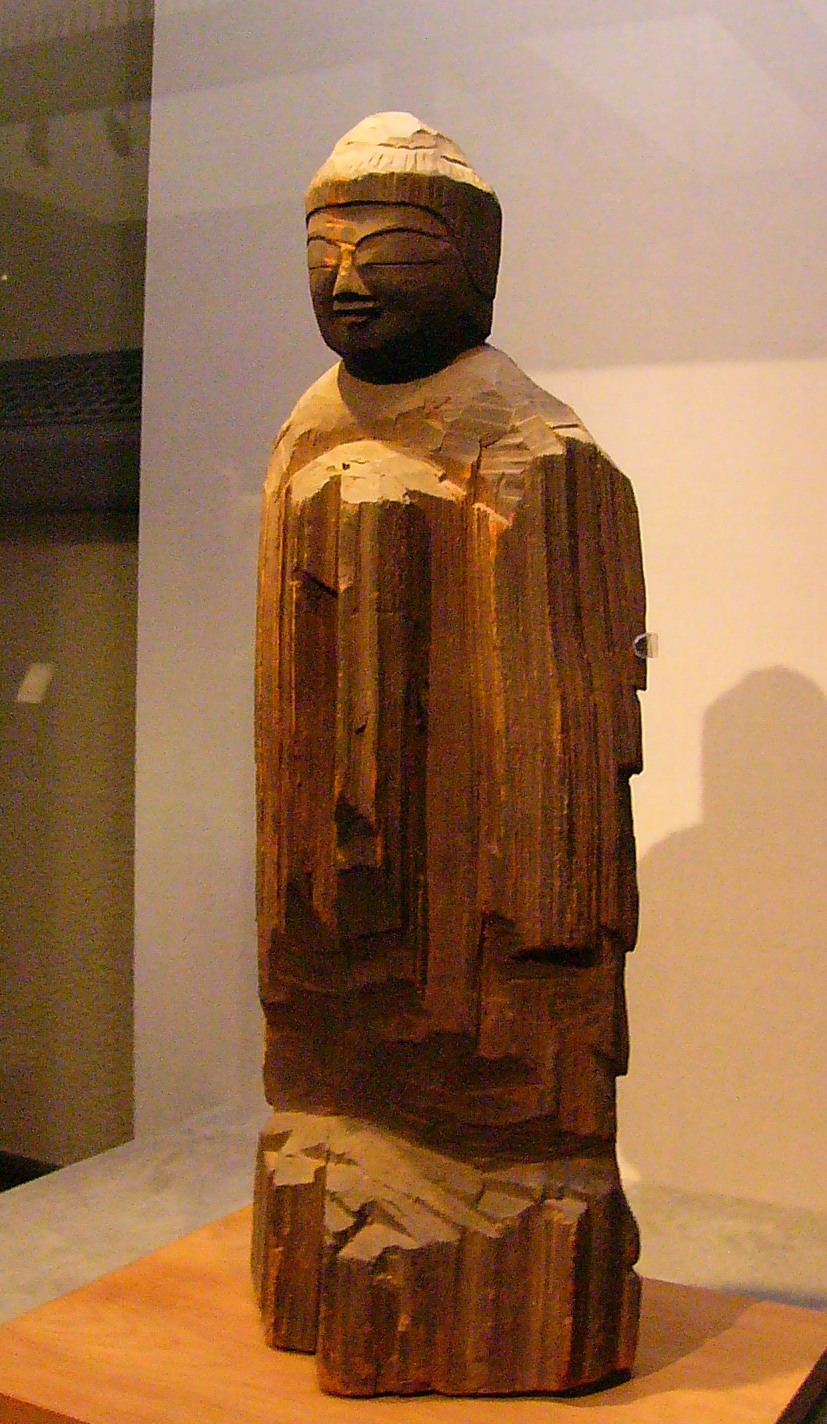
Enkū died 24 August

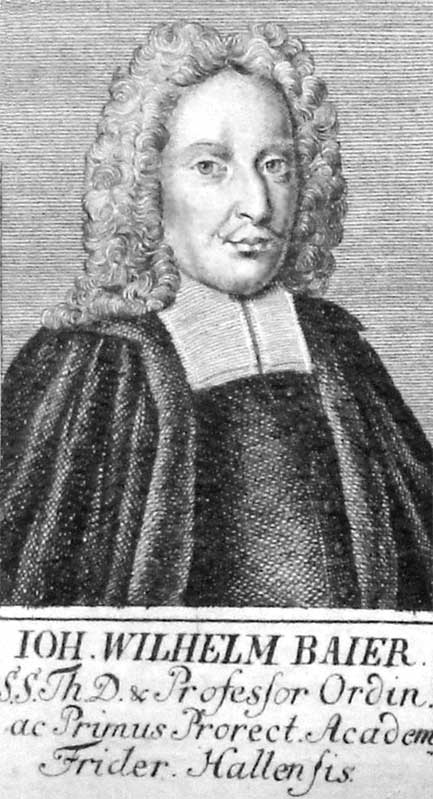
Johann Wilhelm Baier died 19 October

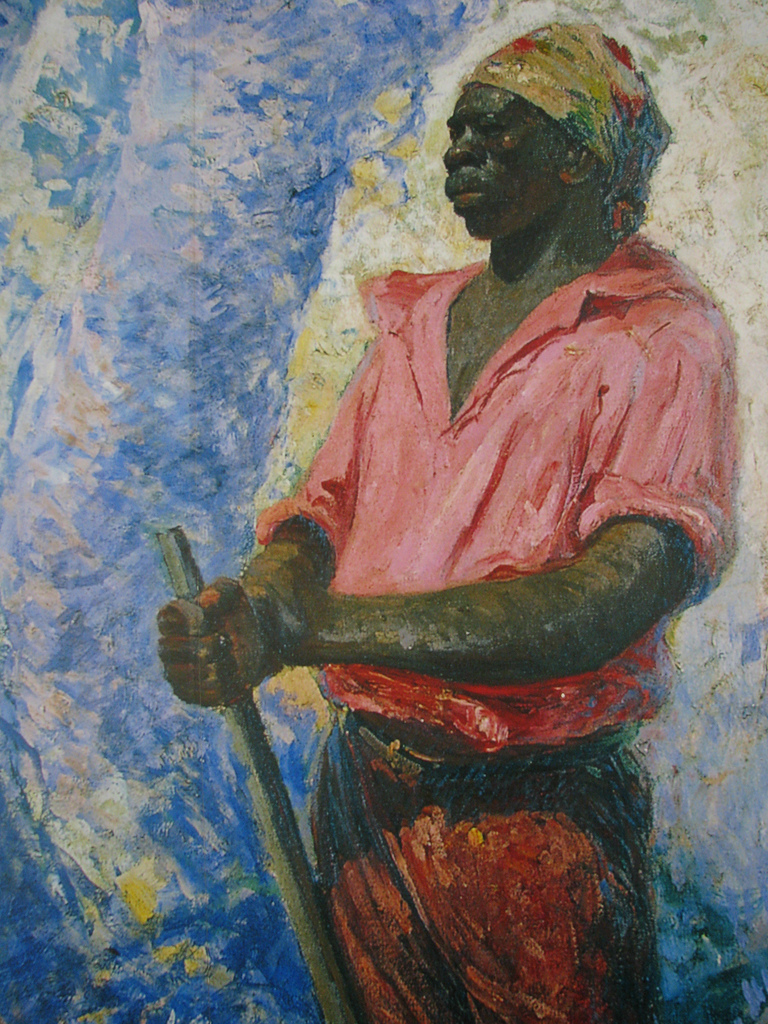
Zumbi died 20 November

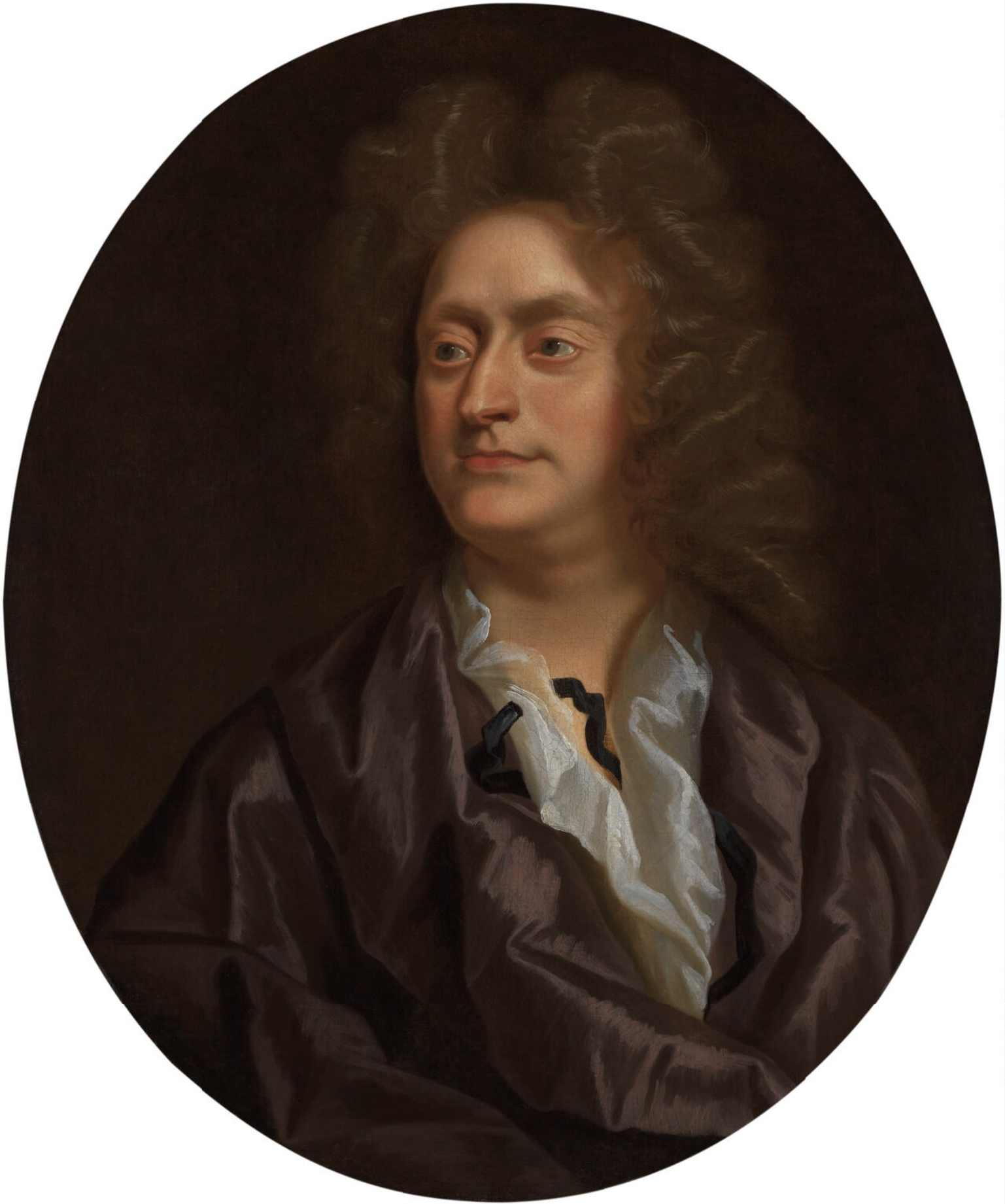
Henry Purcell died 21 November

=== January–March ===
- January 4 – François-Henri de Montmorency, duc de Luxembourg, Marshal of France (b. 1628)
- January 6 – Christian Albert, Duke of Holstein-Gottorp, Duke of Schleswig-Holstein-Gottorp (b. 1641)
- January 11 – Nizel Rivers, Member of Parliament of England (b. 1614)
- January 16 – Hans Adam Weissenkircher, Austrian painter (b. 1646)
- January 26 – Johann Jakob Wepfer, Swiss pathologist (b. 1620)
- January 27 – Francesco Nasini, Italian painter (b. 1611)
- January 29
  - Paul Hermann, German botanist (b. 1646)
  - Diego Sarmiento Valladares, Spanish bishop (b. 1611)
- February 6 – Ahmed II, Sultan of the Ottoman Empire from 1691 to 1695 (b. 1643)
- February 11
  - John Bennet, 1st Baron Ossulston, English politician (b. 1616)
  - Abraham Hinckelmann, German theologian (b. 1652)
- February 14 – Georg von Derfflinger, field marshal in the army of Brandenburg-Prussia (b. 1606)
- February 18 – Sir William Phips, First royal governor of the Province of Massachusetts Bay (b. 1651)
- February 24 – Johann Ambrosius Bach, German musician, father to Johann Sebastian Bach (b. 1645)
- March 4 – Philip Sherard, English politician (b. 1623)
- March 5 – Henry Wharton, English writer (b. 1664)
- March 6 – Everhard Jabach, German private banker (b. 1618)
- March 12 – Cristoval Royas de Spinola, Spanish bishop and diplomat (b. 1626)
- March 15 – Rutger von Langerfeld, Dutch painter and architect (b. 1635)
- March 23 – Adam Perelle, French draughtsman and painter (b. 1640)
- March 25 – Ludwika Karolina Radziwiłł, margravine consort of Brandenburg (b. 1667)
- March 26
  - George Nevill, 12th Baron Bergavenny, English noble (b. 1665)
  - Jan Karol Opaliński, Polish starost and kasztelan of Poznań (b. 1642)
- March 28 – William Douglas, 1st Duke of Queensberry, British politician (b. 1637)
- March 30 – Anselm Franz von Ingelheim, Archbishop of Mainz (b. 1634)

=== April–June ===
- April 3 – Melchior d'Hondecoeter, painter and engraver from the Northern Netherlands (b. 1636)
- April 5 – George Savile, 1st Marquess of Halifax, English writer and statesman (b. 1633)
- April 6 – Richard Busby, English clergyman (b. 1606)
- April 12 – Jean-Baptiste Corneille, French historical painter, etcher, and engraver (b. 1649)
- April 13
  - Petrus Draghi Bartoli, Roman Catholic patriarch (b. 1646)
  - Jean de La Fontaine, French poet, fabulist and writer (b. 1621)
- April 15
  - Christoph Arnold, German astronomer (b. 1650)
  - Claude Lancelot, French monk and grammarian (b. 1615)
- April 17
  - Juana Inés de la Cruz, Mexican nun, writer, philosopher, composer and poet (b. 1648)
  - Henri Testelin, French painter (b. 1616)
- April 20 – Georg Caspar Wecker, German composer (b. 1632)
- April 23
  - Petronella Dunois, Dutch art collector (b. 1650)
  - Henry Vaughan, Welsh author, physician and metaphysical poet (b. 1621)
- April 27 – John Trenchard, English politician (b. 1649)
- April 29 – Jan Karol Dolski, Polish-Lithuanian noble (b. 1637)
- April 30 – Ikegusuku Anken, sanshikan of Ryukyu (b. 1635)
- May 1 – Goeku Chōsei, sanshikan of Ryukyu (b. 1621)
- May 5 – Daniel Brevint, Jersey writer and clergyman (b. 1616)
- May 9 – Lambert van Haven, Danish-Norwegian architect (b. 1630)
- May 15 – Patrick Lyon, 3rd Earl of Strathmore and Kinghorne, Scottish peer (b. 1643)
- May 17 – Cornelis de Heem, Dutch painter (b. 1631)
- May 24 – Matsudaira Yorishige, daimyo of the early Edo period; 1st lord of Takamatsu (b. 1622)
- May 29
  - Sürmeli Ali Pasha, Ottoman grand vizier (b. 1645)
  - Giuseppe Recco, Italian painter (b. 1634)
- May 30
  - Andreas Albinowski, Roman Catholic prelate, Auxiliary Bishop of Włocławek (1695– (b. 1640)
  - Pierre Mignard, French painter (b. 1612)
- June 3 – Philip Aranda, Spanish Jesuit theologian (b. 1642)
- June 7 – Elias Rudolph Camerarius Sr., German physician (b. 1641)
- June 11 – André Félibien, French architect (b. 1619)
- June 15 – Jean Dieu de Saint-Jean, French painter (b. 1654)
- June 27 – Prince Christian of Denmark, Danish prince (b. 1675)
- June 29 – Sir Edward Wyndham, 2nd Baronet, politician (b. 1667)

=== July–September ===
- July 8 – Christiaan Huygens, Dutch mathematician and physicist who developed the wave theory of light (b. 1629)
- July 18 – Johannes Camphuys, Governor-General of the Dutch East Indies (b. 1634)
- July 23 – Charles Philip of Brandenburg-Schwedt, Titular Margrave of Brandenburg-Schwedt (b. 1673)
- August 2
  - Mattia de Rossi, Italian painter (b. 1637)
  - Gabriel Tammelin, Lutheran clergyman (b. 1641)
- August 6
  - François de Harlay de Champvallon, Roman Catholic archbishop of Paris (b. 1625)
  - Thomas Moore, English politician (b. 1618)
- August 8 – Carel de Vogelaer, Dutch still life painter (b. 1653)
- August 9 – Paulus de Roo, Dutch colonial governor (b. 1658)
- August 12 – Huang Zongxi, Chinese political theorist, philosopher, writer, and soldier (b. 1610)
- August 19
  - Jean-Gilles Delcour, Flemish painter (b. 1632)
  - Christopher Merret, English physician and scientist (b. 1614)
- August 20 – Giuseppe Francesco Borri, Italian alchemist, prophet and doctor (b. 1627)
- August 24 – Enkū, Japanese sculptor and monk (b. 1632)
- August 25 – John Waddon, English politician (b. 1649)
- September – Thomas Tew, English pirate
- September 2 – Giovanni Battista Gentile, Roman Catholic bishop (b. 1658)
- September 15 – Giacomo de Angelis, Catholic cardinal (b. 1610)
- September 17 – Henry Newcome, English nonconformist preacher (b. 1627)
- September 22 – George Carteret, 1st Baron Carteret, English baron (b. 1667)
- September 23 – Karl II von Liechtenstein-Kastelkorn, Prince-Bishop of Olomouc (b. 1623)

=== October–December ===
- October 6 – Gustav Adolph, Duke of Mecklenburg-Güstrow, last Administrator of Ratzeburg (b. 1633)
- October 10 – Tommaso de Rosa, Roman Catholic prelate, Bishop of Policastro and Bishop of Sant'Angelo dei Lombardi e Bisaccia (b. 1621)
- October 13 – Ephrem de Nevers, French missionary (b. 1603)
- October 16 – William Wentworth, 2nd Earl of Strafford, member of England's House of Lords (b. 1626)
- October 17 – Arthur Rawdon, Irish botanist and politician (b. 1662)
- October 19 – Johann Wilhelm Baier, German theologian (b. 1647)
- October 21
  - Johann Arnold Nering, German architect (b. 1659)
  - Teofilo Testa, Roman Catholic prelate, Bishop of Tropea (b. 1631)
- October 29 – Barrington Bourchier, Member of Parliament (b. 1627)
- November 3 – Charles Hutchinson, English politician (b. 1636)
- November 8 – Giovanni Paolo Colonna, Italian composer (b. 1637)
- November 10 – Charles Legardeur de Tilly (b. 1616)
- November 13 – William Byron, 3rd Baron Byron, British Baron (b. 1636)
- November 16 – Pierre Nicole, French Jansensist (b. 1625)
- November 19 – Sir John Guise, 2nd Baronet, English Member of Parliament (b. 1650)
- November 20 – Zumbi, Brazilian leader of a runaway slave colony (b. 1655)
- November 21 – Henry Purcell, English composer (b. 1659)
- November 22 – Francis Nurse, husband of Rebecca Nurse, (accused during the Salem Witch Trials of 1692), (b. 1618)
- November 28
  - Jan Sladký Kozina, Czech revolutionary (b. 1652)
  - Anthony Wood, English antiquarian (b. 1632)
- November 29 – James Dalrymple, 1st Viscount Stair, Scottish lawyer and statesman (b. 1619)
- November 30 – Giacomo Cantelli, Italian cartographer (b. 1643)
- December 7 – Giuseppe Spinucci, Roman Catholic bishop (b. 1617)
- December 8
  - Barthélemy d'Herbelot de Molainville, French orientalist (b. 1625)
  - Mariana of the Purification, Nun of the Carmelite Order of the Ancient Observance (b. 1623)
- December 10 – Leonard Bilson, English Member of Parliament (b. 1616)
- December 12 – Jacob Abendana, British rabbi (b. 1630)
- December 14 – William Bond, Speaker of the Massachusetts Province House (b. 1625)
- December 15 – Richard Hampden, English politician; (b. 1631)
- December 16 – Thomas Boylston, American colonist doctor (b. 1644)
- December 17 – Caleb Carr, Rhode Island colonial governor (b. 1624)
- December 20 – David Pohle, German baroque composer (b. 1624)
- December 24
  - Jacob Johan Hastfer, Swedish field marshal (b. 1647)
  - Louis Thomassin, French bishop and theologian (b. 1619)
- December 30 – Samuel Morland, British academic, diplomat and spy (b. 1625)
