= Wolf Bergelt =

German organist

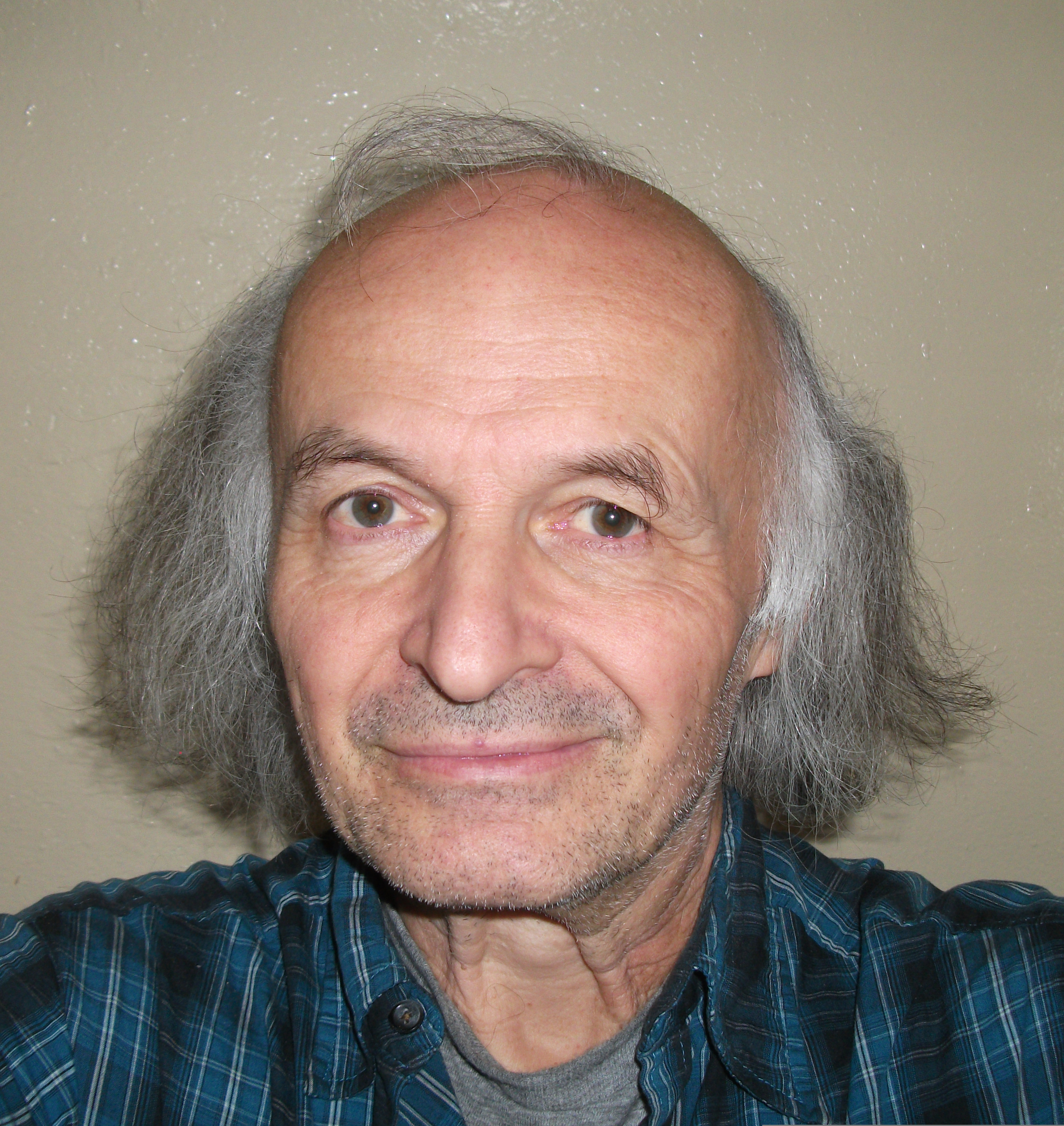
Wolf Bergelt

Wolf Bergelt (born 4 October 1951) is a German author, organist and organ scholar.

== Life ==
Berglelt was born on 4 October 1951 in Oederan, Saxony. He received his first organ lessons from Horst Schröter at the Silbermann organ of the town church of Oederan until his church music studies in Dresden. He completed his compulsory military service as a singer in the Erich-Weinert-Ensemble Berlin. He then worked as a music editor while continuing his church music studies in Halle (Saale), where he dealt with music-historical, music-psychological and instrumental issues, among other things. From 1975 to 1980, he worked as a cantor and organist in Berlin and Prenzlau. It was during this time that he first became involved with the organ heritage of the Mark Brandenburg region, which had hardly been explored until then.

== Work ==
Bergelt has been involved since 1979 with the inventory and systematic historiographical development of the "organ landscape of Brandenburg", which he started from Prenzlau as district church musician of the Uckermark. Since then he has published numerous papers on the history of organ building in Prussia and its heartland Brandenburg (su.). As part of this work, he published regularly from 1983 to 1987 in the traditional Instrumentenbau-Zeitschrift (IbZ) Musik international. In 1989, his first developmental cross-section Die Mark Brandenburg – eine wiederentdeckte Orgellandschaft appeared, which was later published in the work Orgelreisen durch die Mark Brandenburg underwent a considerable expansion. In the same year (2005) he launched the reference work Organ Handbook Brandenburg and in 2009 the edition Dokumente der Orgelwelt.

In 2012, his opus magnum Joachim Wagner – Orgelmacher was published, which is the first comprehensive account of the life and work of the central figure of Prussian organ building and congenial contemporary of Gottfried Silbermann and Arp Schnitger. In this work Bergelt expanded the life story, the list of works as well as the work histories of Joachim Wagner's organs and thus the overall picture of his life and work with essential new insights. The work was highly regarded in both the national and international organ specialist press and beyond. The continuation series Wagner-Geist im Orgelbau der Schüler aims at the extensive presentation of individual work histories from Wagner's circle of students.

In the series Dokumente der Orgelwelt Bergelt appears mainly as editor, where – as in volume 12 – he contributes comments, but also acts as author. The selection of topics concentrates on rare, partly rediscovered or also endangered source material of particular cultural-historical importance and scientific relevance. In this respect, the series also represents a form of source maintenance and preservation.

In addition to his academic work, Bergelt is also active as an artist, with works including the children's audio book Die klingende Königin, the aphorism collection Herzgeist, and the Toccata à la harmonica, a compositional homage to Parisian street musicians was created.

== Publications (selection) ==
=== Author ===
- Die Mark Brandenburg. Eine wiederentdeckte Orgellandschaft. Pape, Berlin 1989, ISBN 3-921140-32-3.
- Dein tief betrübter Papa. Ein Beitrag zur Buchholz-Forschung. Freimut und Selbst, Berlin 1996, ISBN 3-9805293-0-4.
- Die klingende Königin. Eine poesievolle Traumreise zur Orgel. Kinderhörbuch. Freimut & Selbst, Berlin 2002, ISBN 3-9805293-3-9.
- Orgelreisen durch die Mark Brandenburg. Freimut & Selbst, Berlin 2005, ISBN 3-7431-5217-7.
- Joachim Wagner (1690–1749). Orgelmacher. Schnell & Steiner, Regensburg 2012, ISBN 978-3-7954-2562-3.
- Wagner-Geist im Orgelbau der Schüler. Vol. 1: Stettin – St. Marien. Freimut & Selbst, Berlin 2014, ISBN 978-3-7375-5209-7.
- Wagner-Geist im Orgelbau der Schüler. Vol. 2: Stettin – St. Nikolai. Freimut & Selbst, Berlin 2014, ISBN 978-3-7375-0245-0.
- Wagner-Geist im Orgelbau der Schüler. Vol. 3: Stettin – Schlosskirche. Freimut & Selbst, Berlin 2017, ISBN 978-3-7450-6810-8.

=== Editor ===
- "Documents of the organ world"
  - Der Fall Storkow. Ein Beitrag zur Joachim Wagner-Forschung. Vol. 1. Freimut & Selbst, Berlin 2010, ISBN 978-3-7375-9529-2 (Complete documentation).
  - Johann Friedrich Walther: Die in der Königl. Garnison-Kirche zu Berlin befindliche Neue Orgel. Ein Beitrag zur Joachim Wagner-Forschung. Vol. 2. Freimut & Selbst, Berlin 2014, ISBN 978-3-8442-8366-2 (Faksimile der Quelle von 1727).
  - Philipp Wilhelm Stärck: Organi Wrizensis. ein Beitrag zur Joachim-Wagner-Forschung. Vol. 3. Freimut & Selbst, Berlin 2013, ISBN 978-3-8442-8367-9 (Facsimile of the 1729 source).
  - Friedrich Giese: Pommersche Orgeln des 17. Jahrhunderts. Ein Beitrag zur Orgelbaugeschichte. Vol. 4. Freimut & Selbst, Berlin 2012, ISBN 978-3-7375-9572-8.
  - Tobias Kraßke: Frankfurter Orgelschriften. Ein Beitrag zur Matthias Schurig-Forschung. Vol. 5. Freimut & Selbst, Berlin 2010, ISBN 978-3-7375-9540-7.
  - Preußischer Orgelbau – Patente. Ein Beitrag zur preußischen Orgelbaugeschichte. Vol. 6. Freimut & Selbst, Berlin 2012, ISBN 978-3-7375-9564-3.
  - Der Fall Hohenofen. Ein Beitrag zur Marx-Schinkel-Forschung. Vol. 7. Freimut & Selbst, Berlin 2016, ISBN 978-3-7375-9571-1 (Complete documentation).
  - Sammlung einiger Nachrichten von berühmten Orgel-Wercken in Teutschland. Vol. 8. Freimut & Selbst, Berlin 2014, ISBN 978-3-8442-8368-6.
  - Matthäus Hertel: Orgelschlüssel. Co-Herausgeber Wolfgang J. Brylla. Vol. 9. Freimut & Selbst, Berlin 2018, ISBN 978-3-7467-9477-8.
  - August Haupt: Dispositionen. Ein Sammelwerk der Orgelgeschichte. Vol. 10. Freimut & Selbst. Berlin 2016, ISBN 978-3-7375-9938-2.
  - Hermann Mund: Orgeldispositionen Band C. Sammlung Dispositionen. Vol. 11. Freimut & Selbst, Berlin 2014, ISBN 978-3-8442-8694-6.
  - Die ehemalige Scherer-Orgel in Bernau. Eine historiografische Dokumentation. Vol. 12. Freimut & Selbst, Berlin 2016, ISBN 978-3-7418-5316-6.
- Orgelhandbuch Brandenburg (Initiator, Gesamtbetreuung und Autor der lexikalischen Teile: Wolf Bergelt)
  - Hannes Ludwig: Uckermark. Westteil. Vol. 1. Freimut und Selbst, Berlin 2005, ISBN 3-9805293-7-1.
  - Hannes Ludwig: Uckermark. Ostteil. Vol. 2. Freimut und Selbst, Berlin 2008, ISBN 978-3-937378-14-5.
  - Karl Richter: Barnim. Vol. 3. Freimut & Selbst, Berlin 2014, ISBN 978-3-937378-32-9.
  - Karl Richter: Märkisch Oderland. Vol. 4. Freimut & Selbst, Berlin 2012, ISBN 978-3-937378-28-2.
  - Martin Schulze: Oder-Spree / Frankfurt (Oder). Vol. 5. Freimut & Selbst, Berlin 2010, ISBN 978-3-937378-31-2.
