= Philipp von Hörnigk =

German civil servant

Philipp Wilhelm von Hörnigk (sometimes spelt Hornick or Horneck; 23 January 1640 – 23 October 1714) was a German economist and civil servant, who was one of the founders of Cameralism and a supporter of the economic theory of mercantilism.

== Life ==
=== Youth ===
Von Hörnigk was born in Mainz. His parents were the Frankfurt pharmacist and city doctor (Stadtarzt) Ludwig von Hörnigk and his wife Maria Elisabeth de Jacobinis (* 1616). He went to Mainz with his father in 1650 and studied there from 1654, then from 1657 in Leuven, which was at the time part of the Spanish Netherlands, and from 1660 in the prestigious Catholic University of Ingolstadt in Bavaria, where he received his doctorate in 1661. In 1664–1665 he went to Vienna, where he was employed in the service of Bishop Cristoval Rojas de Spinola in Neustadt. From 1669, he was an administrator in the parish of Hartberg in Styria.

From 1673, he worked on trade and inheritance statistics in Vienna, together with Johann Joachim Becher (his brother-in-law, married to his sister Maria Veronika von Hörnigk). In 1680, he was the secretary of the count and Austrian envoy Johann Philipp Graf Lamberg in Berlin. In 1682, he published two tracts on public law, in which he severely criticized any French intentions on German territory.

=== Death ===
In 1690, when his influence at the Viennese court declined, he moved to the Hochstift Passau. There, Von Hörnigk entered the service of Johann Philipp von Lamberg, who had since become bishop there, and became his personal advisor and privy councilor. He then spent the rest of his life in Passau, which at that time was politically closely oriented to Austria. In 1708, he published his last work Historische Anzeig von den eigentliche Ursachen der Privilegierungen des Hochlöblichsten Ertz-Hauses Oesterreich.

== Economic work ==
Von Hörnigk was born in Frankfurt am Main and died in Passau. He wrote in a time when his country was constantly threatened by Turkish invasion. In Oesterreich über alles, wann es nur will (1684, Austria Over All, If She Only Will) he laid out one of the clearest statements of mercantile policy. Since mercenaries at that time formed a large part of the army and the loyalty of the Hungarian nobility in particular depended on cash payments, he advocated a consistently mercantilist policy, the main aim of which was to increase available funds. He primarily called for securing important sources of income such as ore mines such as the Transylvanian gold mines in the Apuse Mountains. In his opinion, the wealth of an empire depended primarily on the raw materials it contained and less on trade, which at that time was mostly limited to luxury goods. He investigated the costs of establishing an Imperial army of a hundred thousand men.

He listed nine principles of national economy:

(1) To inspect the country's soil with the greatest care, and not to leave the agricultural possibilities of a single corner or clod of earth unconsidered...
(2) All commodities found in a country, which cannot be used in their natural state, should be worked up within the country...
(3) Attention should be given to the population, that it may be as large as the country can support...
(4) gold and silver once in the country are under no circumstances to be taken out for any purpose...
(5) The inhabitants should make every effort to get along with their domestic products...
(6) [Foreign commodities] should be obtained not for gold or silver, but in exchange for other domestic wares...
(7) ...and should be imported in unfinished form, and worked up within the country...
(8) Opportunities should be sought night and day for selling the country's superfluous goods to these foreigners in manufactured form...
(9) No importation should be allowed under any circumstances of which there is a sufficient supply of suitable quality at home.

Nationalism, self-sufficiency and national power were the basic policies proposed. This work is considered one of the most important writings of mercantilism and dominated the economic-political discussion for a generation and laid the foundation for absolutist economic policy in the 18th century. A total of 15 editions appeared by 1784.

The title of this work was later taken up by Baron Philipp von Gemmingen for his magazine entitled Teutschland über alles. In 1809 the Austrian poet Heinrich Joseph von Collin also used the same line for a patriotic soldier's song.

== See also ==
- History of economic thought
