= Gerhard Wolter Molanus =

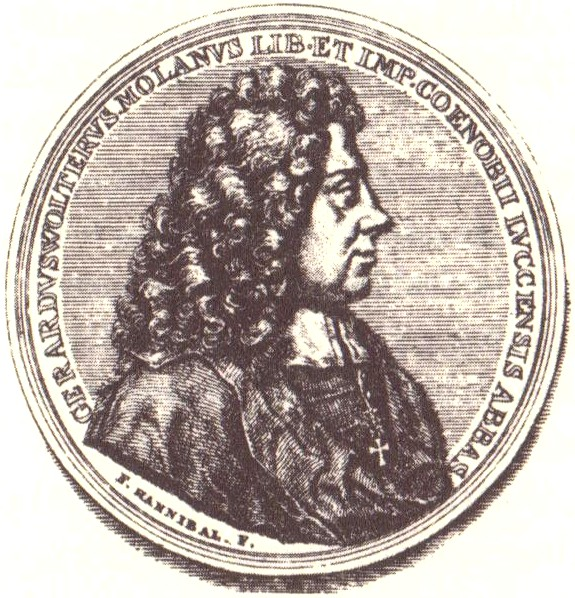
Gerhard Wolter Molanus; Molano into French

Gerhard Wolter Molanus (born Gerhard Wolter van Meulen; 1 November 1633 in Hameln (25 m. s.w. of Hanover) – 7 September 1722 at Loccum) was Lutheran theologian and abbot of Loccum.

== Biography ==
He studied theology at Helmstedt; and in 1659 was appointed professor of mathematics and theology at University of Rinteln. 1671 Molanus became conventual of a Lutheran Loccum Abbey and 1672 coadjutor of the abbot. There he lived in celibacy according to the Rule of St. Benedict. In 1674 Duke John Frederick called him to Hanover as director of the consistory after Justus Gesenius († 1673). 1677 he became abbot of Loccum under title Gerhard I, one of the most influential offices in the duchy.

As a disciple of Calixtus during the Syncretistic Controversy, Molanus used his power to abolish the hostility which prevailed between the Lutherans and the Reformed. He was very active in aiding the Reformed, who after their expulsion from France by the revocation of the edict of Nantes (1685) found a refuge in the country of Hanover. Molanus was also commissioned by the duke to bring about a reconciliation between Protestants and Roman Catholics. The Roman Catholic representative was Cristoval Royas de Spinola, who appeared in Hanover in 1676 and then in 1683. These discussions were followed in 1691, 1692, and 1693 by negotiations between Bossuet and Molanus, but no agreement resulted.

Molanus found himself in agreement with Bossuet in regarding most of the differences between the Catholics and the Lutherans as misunderstandings or as different designations of the same content. But he did not regard the Council of Trent legitimate because the Protestants had been condemned without being heard, and because it had not been accepted by the entire Catholic Church. Molanus considered further negotiations in vain, as the Protestants would never concede the matter of communion under both species. On account of the spirit of conciliation which Molanus manifested in these negotiations, it was rumored that he had become Roman Catholic, and he had to defend himself publicly in letters and treatises.
