= María Anna Águeda de San Ignacio =

Mexican author

María Anna Aguilar Velarde (March 3, 1695 – February 25, 1756), more commonly known as Sor María Anna Águeda de San Ignacio, was a Mexican author.

She was born in Atlixco in New Spain (now Mexico) to a Spanish father and an American mother. In 1714, at the age of nineteen, she entered the Beaterio de Santa Rosa, a Catholic convent in Puebla.

In 1740, she was elected abbess of the convent. Aguilar was a prolific writer on religious subjects and her writing was highly regarded during her lifetime. She authored four treatises on mystical and theological subjects as well as spiritual guidebooks for nuns.
