= Armand Jules de Rohan-Guéméné =

French ecclesiastic, Peer of France and archbishop

His Grace Armand-Jules de Rohan-Guémené
- Archbishop-Duke of Reims, Peer of France
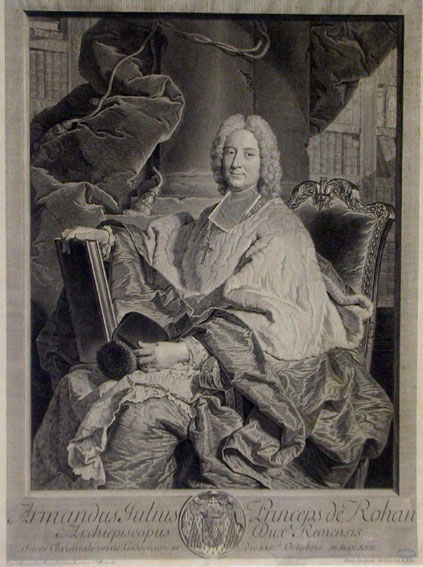
- Church: Roman Catholic
- Archdiocese: Reims
- See: Notre Dame de Reims
- Installed: 6 July 1722
- Term ended: 28 August 1762
- Predecessor: François de Mailly
- Successor: Charles Antoine de La Roche-Aymon

Personal details
- Born: 10 February 1695 Paris, France
- Died: 28 August 1762 (aged 67) Saverne, Alsace-Lorraine, France

Armand-Jules de Rohan-Guémené (Paris, 10 February 1695 - Saverne, 28 August 1762) was a French ecclesiastic, Peer of France and the Archbishop of Reims.

== Early life ==
Prince de Guemene was the fifteenth child of Charles III de Rohan, Prince of Guémene and Duke of Montbazon and his second wife, Charlotte-Elisabeth de Cochefilet (1657-1719), daughter of Charles de Cochefilet of Vauvineux and Françoise-Angélique d'Aubry.

== Career ==
He was admitted early to the Chapter of the Cathedral of Strasbourg. He provided the abbeys of the Gard in the diocese of Amiens (1715), then of Gorge in that of Metz (1730). He became Archbishop of Reims on 2 June 1722, was confirmed on 6 July 1722 and made sacred on 23 August 1722. Gueme anointed Louis XV at his coronation in Reims on 25 October of the same year.

Within his diocese, he exerted a great deal of activity to make the Unigenitus bull accepted but, having taken a seat in the Parliament of Paris as the first ecclesiastical peer, he gradually relied on his Vicars-general to govern the diocese. He nevertheless published a Breviarium in 1759, and died three years later at Saverne.

== Iconography ==
The archbishop is shown dressed in an ample garment reflecting his condition: archbishop's dress, lace flaps, especially ermine, collars and crosses. He sits in a gilt and sculptured armchair that is often found at the artist's. He holds in his left hand the characteristic burette and on the other the dish of a book, standing on his knees. The bottom of the picture shows a column dressed in a heavy animated drape, barely hiding a library in the background. The current location of the original painting is not known, but a print was made in 1739 by Gilles-Edme Petit.

== Heraldry ==
Coat of arms of Armand-Jules de Rohan-Guéméné

A coat of arms with cartel: in 1 and 4: Gules with golden chains laid in an orle, cross and saltire, loaded in the heart of a natural emerald (which is from Navarre); in 2 and 3: azure with three fleurs de lys d'or (which is from France); on the whole, gone: in 1: Gules with nine twins of gold, placed 3, 3, 3 (which is Rohan); and in 2: of ermine (which is from Brittany).
