= Mathias Chardon =

Mathias Chardon (name in religion Charles) (b. at Yvoi-Varignan, Ardennes, France, 22 September 1695; d. at the monastery of St-Arnold in Metz, 21 October 1771) was a French Benedictine scholar of the Congregation of Saint-Vannes.

== Life ==
He took vows in the monastery of St-Vannes (St-Viton) in Verdun in 1712, and became known for his learning. At the general chapter of the Congregation of St-Vannes, held at Toul, in 1730, Chardon was forced to resign his office as a professor because he opposed the Bull Unigenitus.

== Works ==
The "Histoire des Sacraments" (Paris, 1745, 6 vols.) was written against the Sacramentarians. It is a historical work, showing how the sacraments were administered in the Catholic Church, and how they were used from the time of the Apostles to his days. There is also an Italian translation (Verona, 1754; Brescia, 1758; Capolago, 1835), a Spanish translation (Madrid, 1799-1801) and it is reprinted in Migne, "Cursus Theologiae" (Paris, 1840), XX, 1-1152.
