= Jean Dieu de Saint-Jean =

French painter

Jean Dieu de Saint-Jean was a French painter (1654–1695), son of Jean Dieu (1625 – c. 1638).

== Works ==
- Musée du château de Blois, Portrait du musicien Marin Marais, signed I DE S IE, referring to his initials "J. de S. Je(an)."

== Bibliography ==
- Jonathan Dunford and Pierre-Gilles Girault. Un portrait du musicien Marin Marais par Jean Dieu de Saint-Jean au musée du château de Blois ("a portrait of the musician Marin Marais by Jean Dieu de Saint-Jean in the musée du château de Blois"). Les cahiers du château et des musées de Blois, no.37, Dec 2006 – June 2007, pp. 15–21.
