= Philippe-Claude de Montboissier de Beaufort =

French politician (1695–1765)

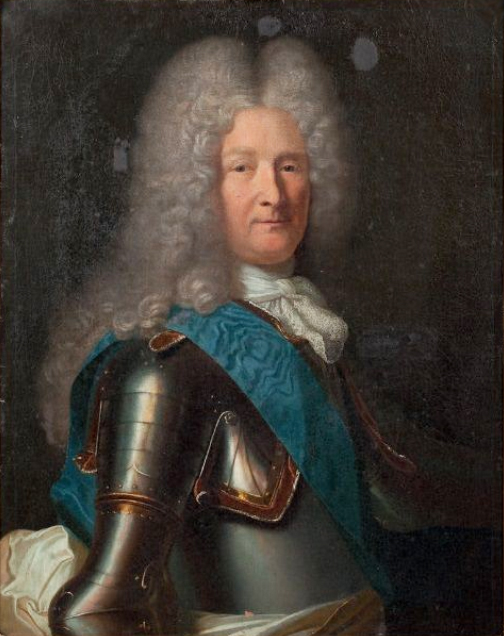
Philippe de Montboissier-Beaufort-Canillac, 7e. Marquis de Canillac

Noël-Philippe-Claude de Montboissier de Beaufort, marquis de Canillac (16 February 1695 – 31 September 1765), was an 18th-century French soldier, diplomat and peer of France.

The son of Jean-Gaspard de Montboissier, baron de Dienne (who died 1714) by his wife Marie-Claire (died 1730), daughter of Jean d'Estaing, marquis de Saillant, he was commissioned as a cavalry officer in the French Army.

He was promoted Brigadier-General in 1719, Maréchal de camp in 1734 and Lieutenant-General in 1738. The Marquis also served as Ambassador to Rome, before being posted to London.

The marquis married, in 1711, Marie-Anne-Geneviève de Maillé de La Tour-Landry (died 1742), daughter of Louis-Joseph de Maillé-Brézé, baron de Coulonces, by his wife Louise Mallier du Houssay. They had two sons and two daughters.

== See also ==
- Château de Montboissier
- Duc de Beaufort
- Honoré de Balzac
- List of Ambassadors of France to the United Kingdom
