= Charles Guillaume Loys de Bochat =

Swiss jurist and antiquarian (1695–1754)

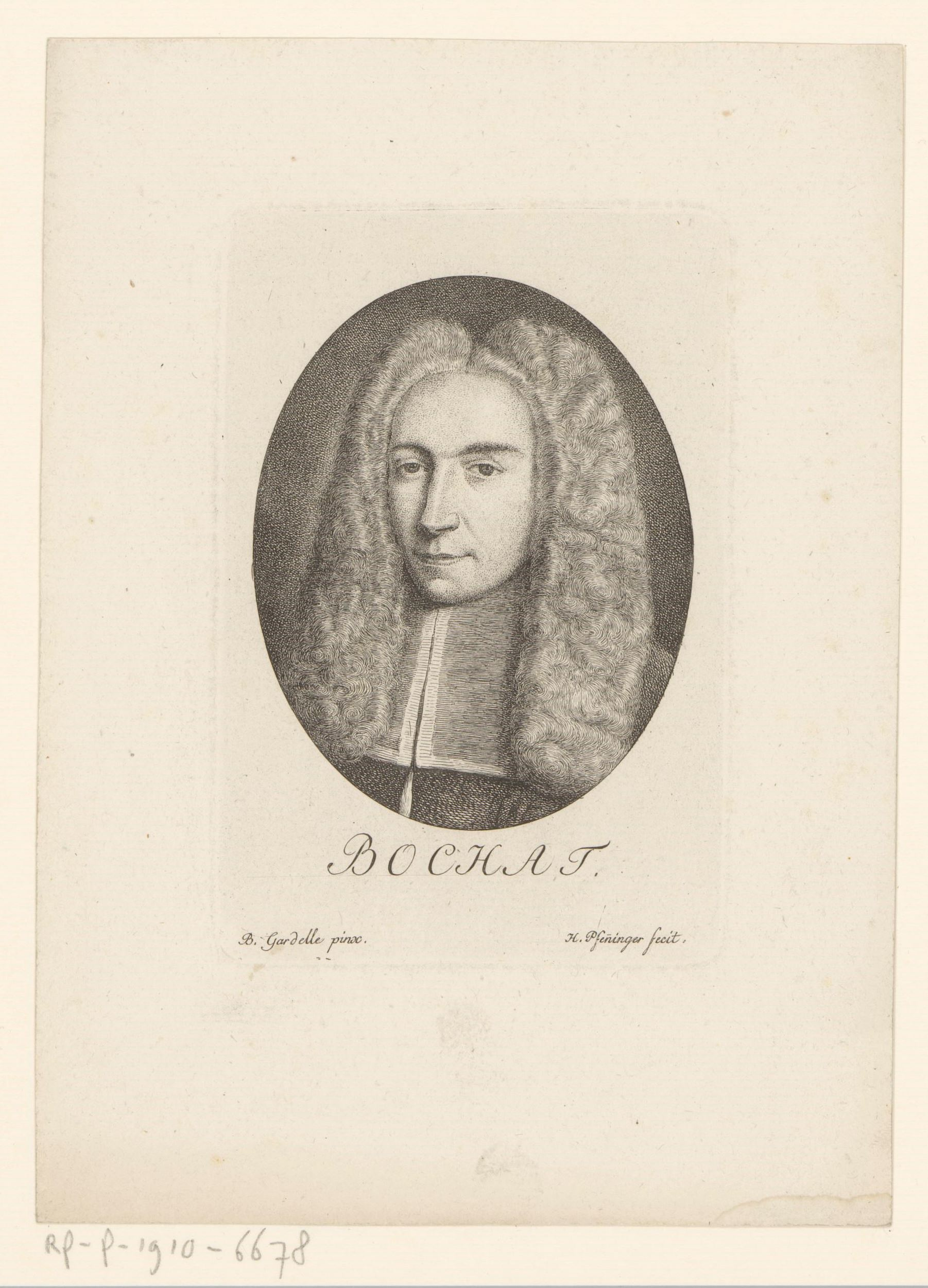
Portrait by Heinrich Pfenninger, after a contemporary portrait by Robert Gardelle

Charles Guillaume Loys de Bochat (11 December 1695 – 4 April 1754) was a Swiss jurist, historian and antiquarian.

== Biography ==
Loys de Bochat was born on 11 December 1695 in Lausanne. He studied theology in Basel, which he interrupted for health reasons, and later changed his subject to law, in which he graduated in 1717. He became professor of law in Lausanne in 1718, but he was granted leave to travel for three years, which he spent in Halle, in Leyden and in France.

From 1721, he taught law at the Lausanne Academy, where he acted as rector from 1727 to 1730. In 1738, he proposed to transform the academy into a full university, without success.

Loys de Bochat is best known for his major work, Mémoires critiques pour servir d'Eclaircissemens sur divers points de l'Histoire ancienne de la Suisse, which appeared in three volumes in 1747–1749. This work is dedicated to examining the early history of Switzerland, especially the Gaulish Helvetii, and their legacy in Swiss toponymy. He died on 4 April 1754 in Lausanne.

== Tomb ==
His tomb is in the ambulatory of the Lausanne Cathedral.

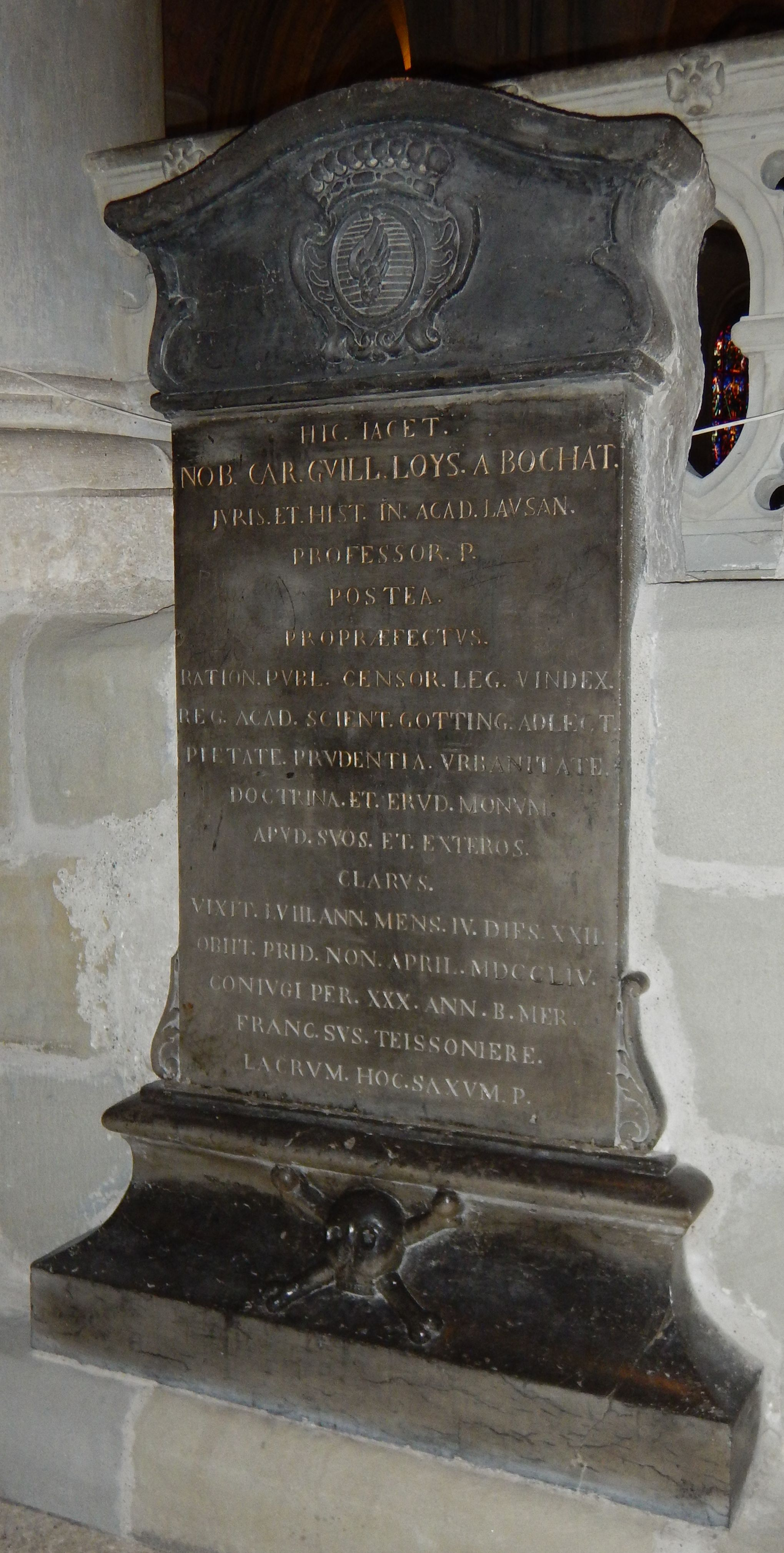
hic iacet nob. car. guill. loys. a bochat. juris. et. hist. in. acad. lausan. professor. p. postea. propræfectus. ration.publ.censor.leg.index. reg.acad.scient.gotting.adlect. pietate.prudentia.urbanitate. doctrina.et.erud.monum. apud.suos.et.enteros. clarus. vixit.LVIII.ann.mens.IV.dies XXII. obiit.prid.non.april.MDCCLIV. coniugi per.XXX.annb.mer. franc.sus.teissoniere. lacrum.hoc.saxum.p.	Here rests the noble Charles Guillaume Loys de Bochat jurist and historian in the Lausanne Academy He lived 58 years, 4 months and 22 days.
