= Cai Wan =

Chinese poet

Cai Wan (1695-1755), was a Chinese poet.

She was the daughter of the noble official Cao Yurong and married to the cabinet minister Gao Quizhou. She was educated within Confucianism, and published her own collection of poems. Cai Wan had an acknowledged influence as the adviser of her spouse, who reportedly confided his suggestions to her before introducing them to the government.
