= Joseph Anton Glantschnigg =

German painter

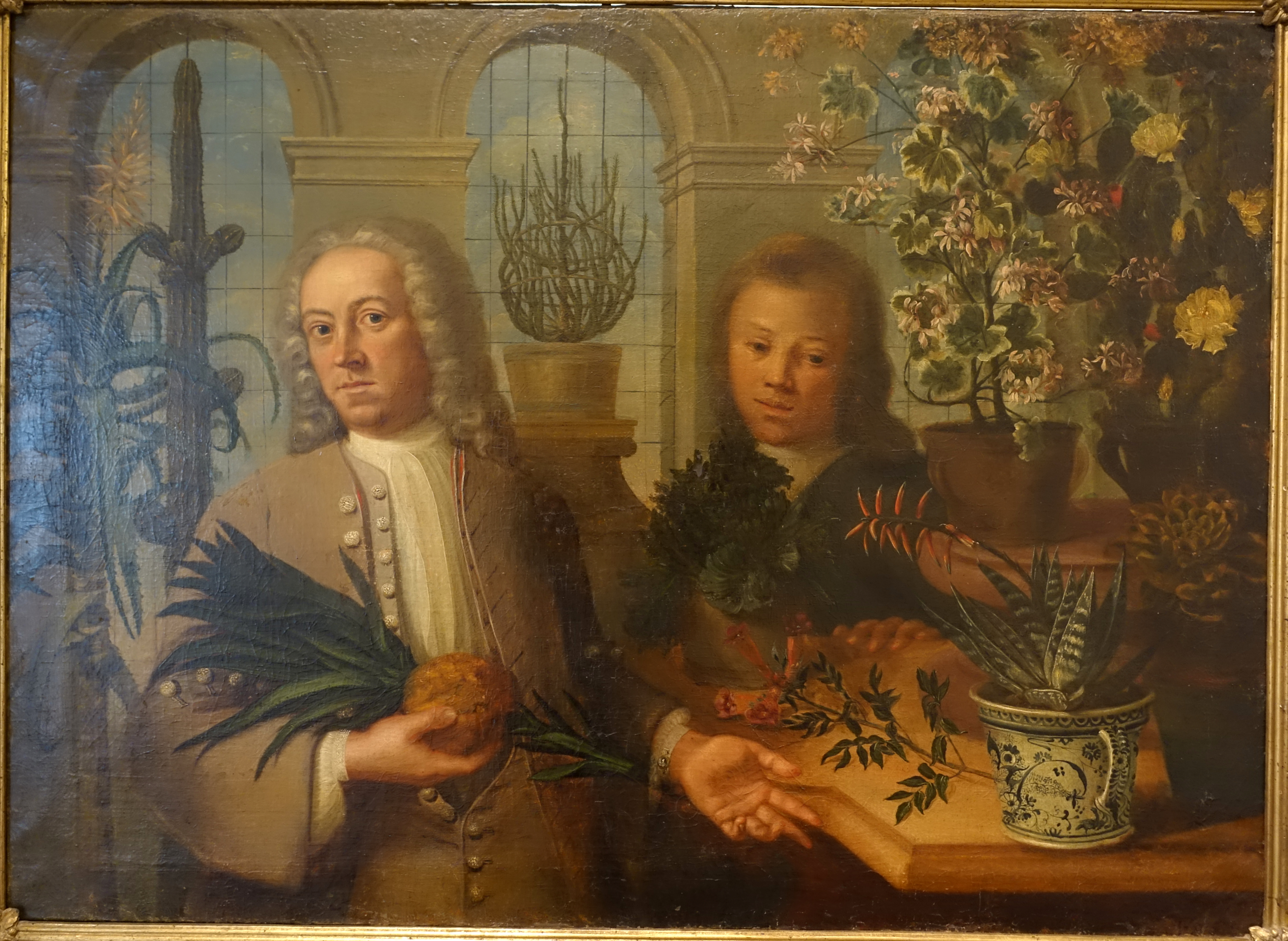
Orangerie scene with allegories of Europe and Asia, by Joseph Anton Glantschnigg, c. 1745

Joseph Anton Glantschnigg (1695–1750) was a German painter of historical, genre, and landscape scenes, born and deceased in Bolzano, but active in Würzburg in the Prince-Bishopric of Würzburg. He was the son of painter Ulrich Glantschnigg.
