= Rutger von Langerfeld =

Dutch mathematician, painter, and architect

Rutger von Langerfeld, or Rutger van Langevelt (15 February 1635, in Nijmegen – 15 March 1695, in Berlin), was a Dutch mathematician, painter and architect. He moved to the court of Frederick William (later king of Prussia) during the summer of 1678.
