= Petronella Dunois =

Dutch art collector

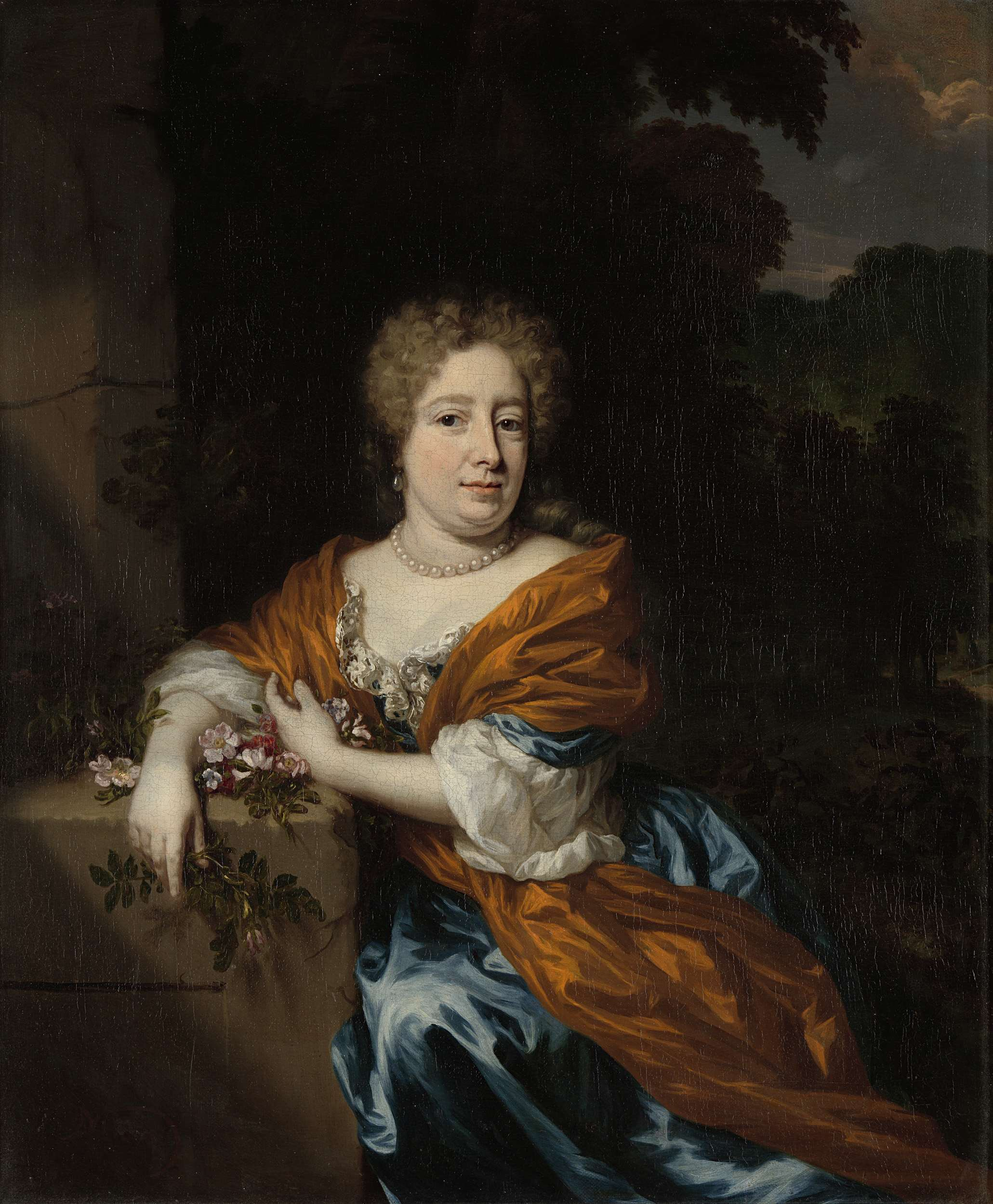
- Portrait by Nicolaes Maes
- Born: 1650; The Hague
- Died: 23 April 1695 (aged 44–45); Leiden

Petronella Dunois (1650–1695) was a Dutch art collector, known for her dollhouse in the Rijksmuseum in Amsterdam.

== Life ==
Dunois lived with her sister Maria in Amsterdam after her parents died. Both sisters were rich and commissioned their own dollhouse, but only Petronella's has been preserved through the centuries. It is mentioned first in her dowry list in 1677. In that year, Dunois married the Leiden regent Pieter van Groenendijck. Besides the dollhouse, her list contained other costly items such as linens and stock options. In 1680 the couple's portraits were painted by the leading Hague portrait painter Nicolaes Maes. The dollhouse was preserved in the family, descending via the female line until the dollhouse was donated to the museum in 1934. In 1994 the museum was able to purchase the pendant wedding portraits of the former owners.

== Gallery ==
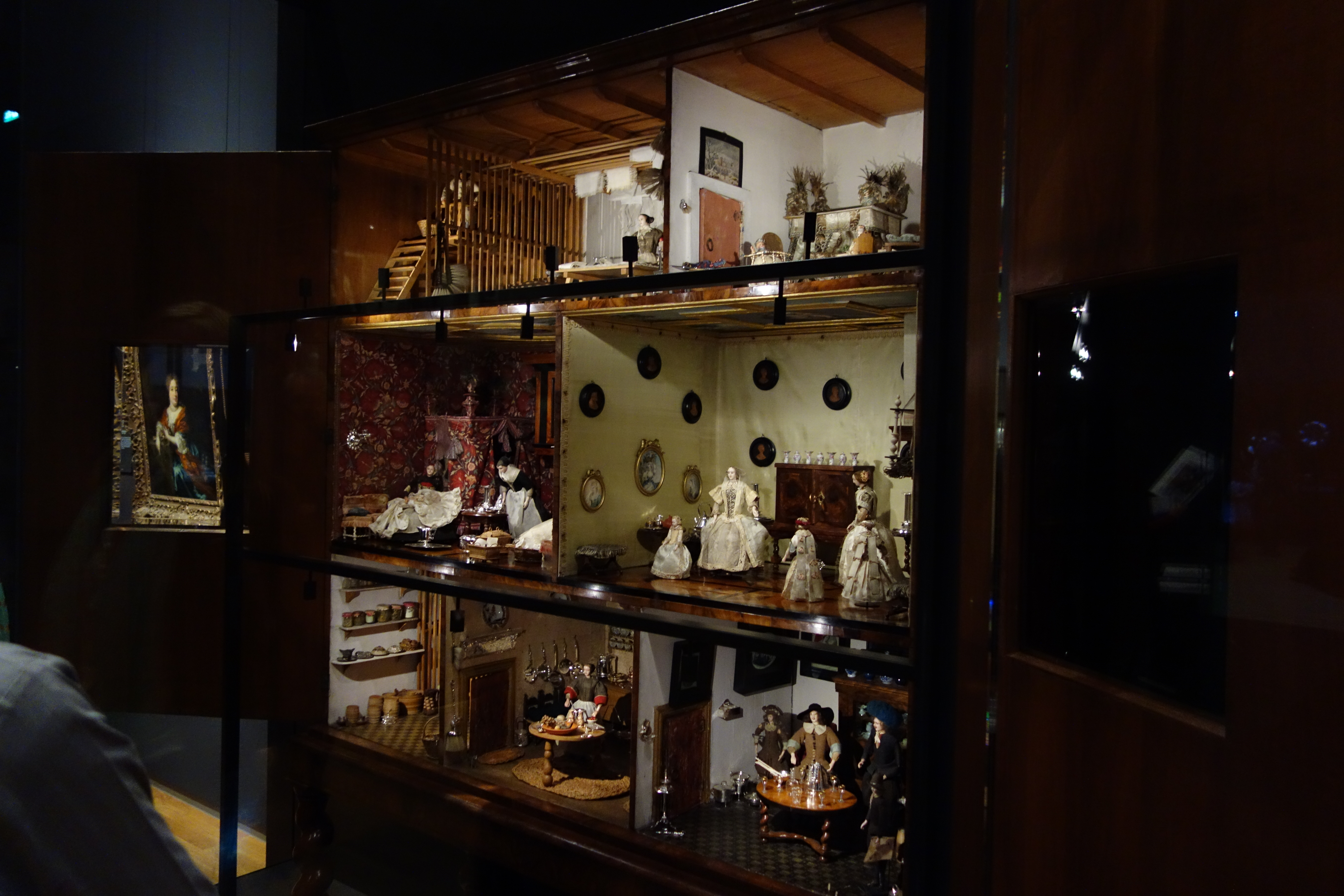
The dollhouse is kept today in a dimly lit room to preserve the textiles

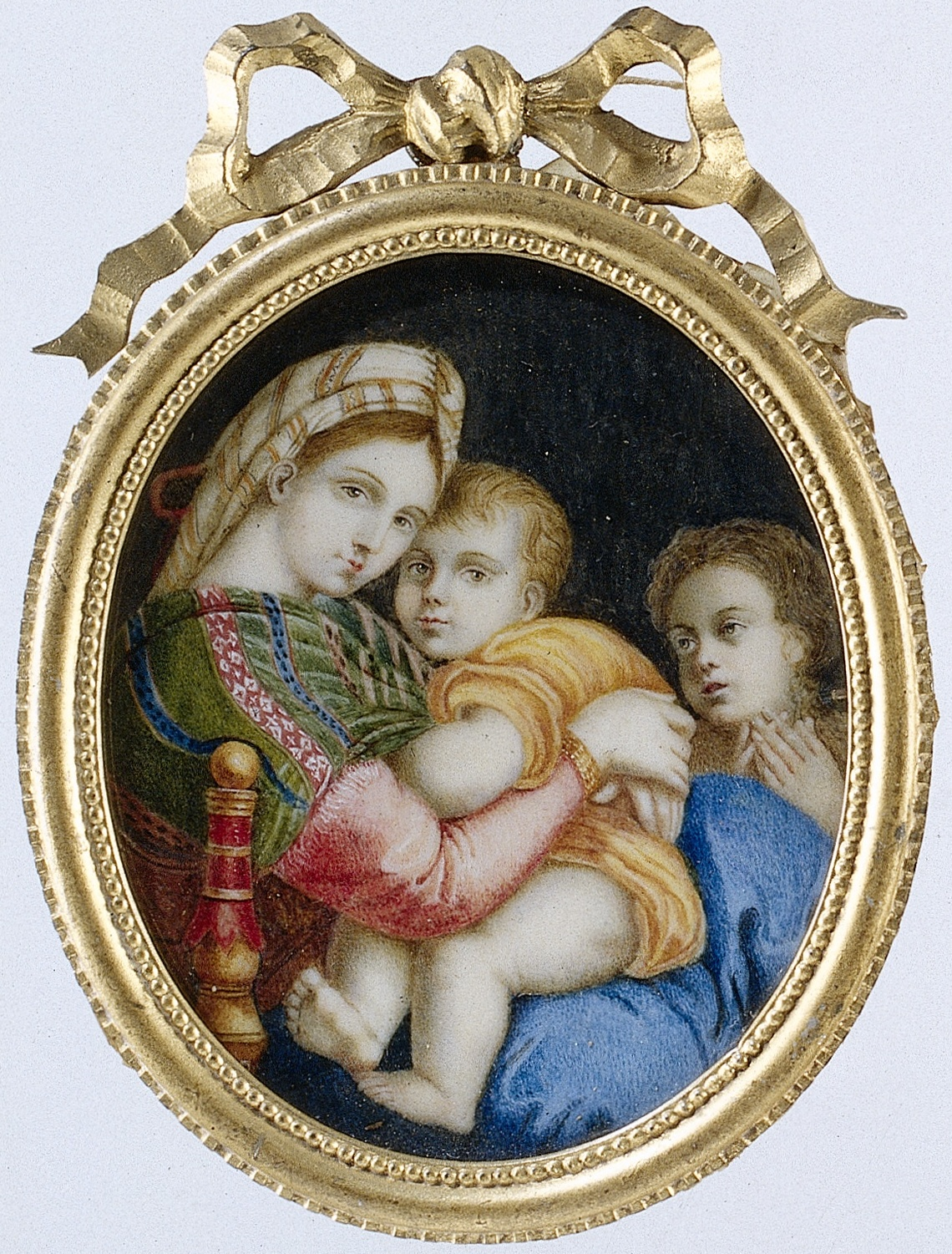
One of the miniatures in the dollhouse is a reproduction after Raphael's Madonna della seggiola

== Provenance ==
According to the woman who donated the dollhouse in 1934, it was originally in the collection of the admiral Michiel de Ruyter. The Amsterdam historian Isabella van Eeghen tried to prove this in her 1953 article about the dollhouse, but this was later disproved by Fock, though the donor was indeed a descendant of De Ruyter.
