= Mihael Summa =

Albanian Catholic Archbishop (1695-1777)

Mikel Suma
- Born: March 12, 1695; Balba, Diocese of Sapë, Albania
- Died: November 20, 1777 (aged 82); Osijek, Croatia
- Education: Theology
- Occupations: Archbishop, priest
- Years active: 1718–1777
- Religion: Albanian Catholic
- Church: Church of Rome
- Ordained: 1727
- Offices held: Archbishop of Skopje

Mihael Summa or Mikel Suma (March 12, 1695 – November 20, 1777) was the Albanian Catholic Archbishop of Skopje from 1728 to 1743, having succeeded Peter Karagić.

== Life and career ==
Suma was born in Balba, Albania, in the Diocese of Sapë to a noble Catholic family. On the same day he was baptized as "Zupin" by Don Nikola Kabashi. Suma was described as kind and diligent. Don Tibeo Paccalorzi, the principal of the Fermo College in Rome, wrote on April 15, 1711, that "Mihael Summa is a person of which much is expected." When Suma returned home from his studies, he was ordained a priest on 28 October 1718, in the parish church of Saxony by Marin Gjini. On 29 October Peter Karagić appointed Suma as his vicar general. Suma became the capital vicar of the archdiocese in 1727 after Peter Karagić died on 15 January. Archbishop Vicko Zmajević wrote on May 16, 1727 to the Rome Congregation recommending Suma as the archbishop of Skopje. In 1727, after an investigation, the Pope selected Suma as the new archbishop, and he was appointed on 15 November 1728. He was ordained a bishop on 3 July 1729 in Crkva sv. Spasitelja, Velja.

In 1728, during the Great Turkish War, Suma began negotiations with the Austrian forces but was exposed by the Ottomans. He was forced to flee to Austria at the end of 1736. In the same year, he visited Osijek, Croatia. In 1737, Suma led the Albanian highlanders in an anti-Ottoman revolt, but after the Austrian forces retreat through Novi Pazar, the Albanians were left to resist for three years.

During the spread of the plague in the region, it is believed that Suma stayed in Belgrade, but letters to Rome written on 6 April and 6 June 1739 show that he traveled to the Pešter region in the Novi Pazar. In his letters he describing how his countrymen in Pešter and Novi Pazar were subjected to Austrian rule. Suma was fluent in Albanian, Croatian and Turkish resulting in him being appreciated by the local Turks and Orthodox believers in Skopje (Shkup). After the Turks seized Belgrade, Suma fled to Osijek, where he had the status of an Imperial senior citizen, with 1800 forints a year as pension. He lived with his son, sat on the city council and became a merchant.

Before 23 September 1743, Suma resigned as Archbishop, becoming Archbishop Emeritus.

In 1765, Suma bought a house, where he lived with his son. He preached in Dakovo, Pedukh, Petrijevci, Valpov, Dardi, Vukovar, Ilok and Petrovaradin for many decades.

In May 1777, Suma fell ill and on 20 November, at the age of 82, he died in his home surrounded by relatives. Suma was buried at the Franciscan church in Osijek by Bishop Krtica. In July 1778, a monument of black marble was raised above his tomb. Suma had been a priest for 59 years and a bishop for 48.
