= Johann Friedrich Walther =

German teacher, organist and draughtsman

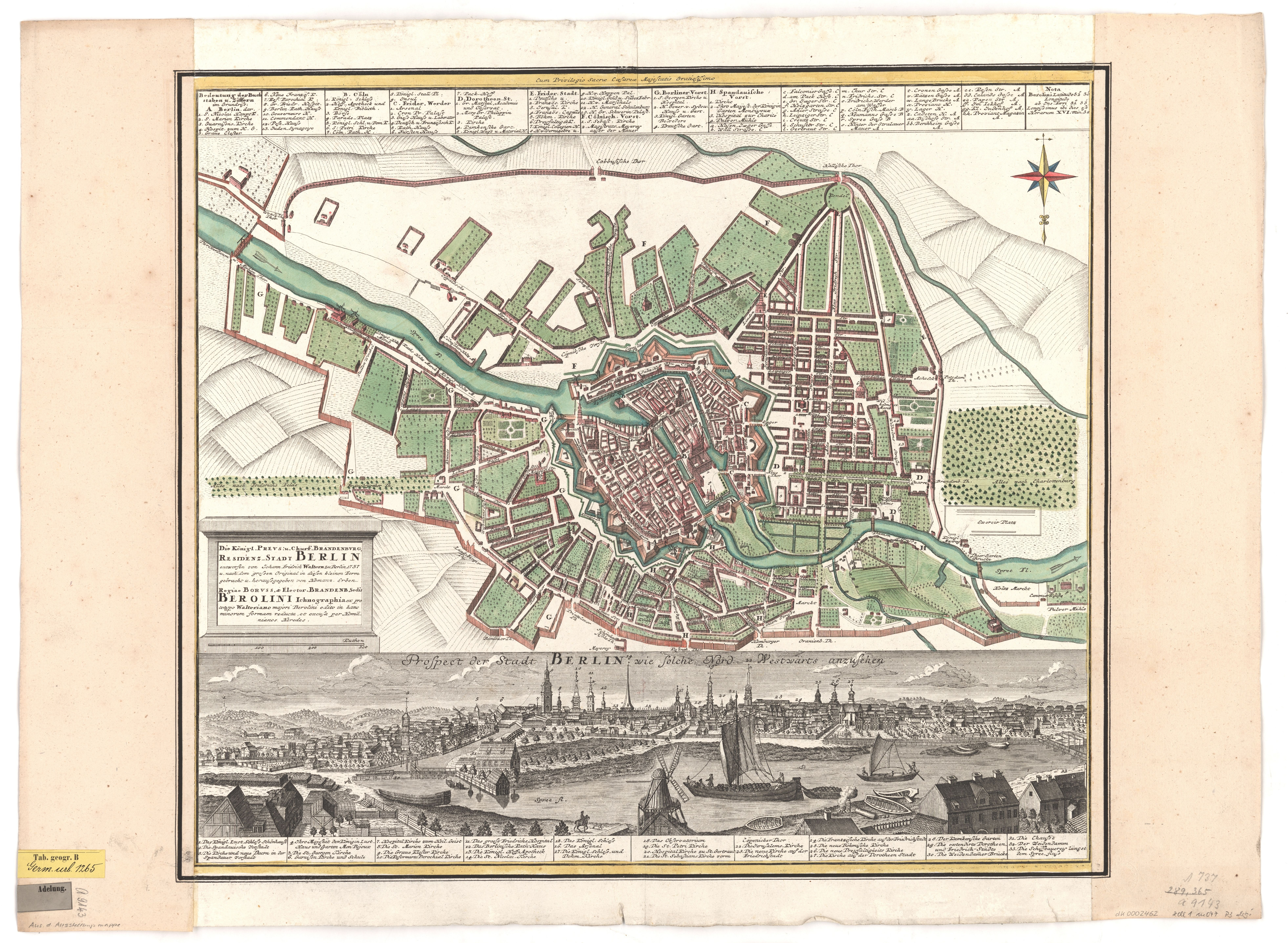
The Royal Prussian and Royal Brandenburg Residence. Residenz - City of Berlin designed by Johann Fridrich Walther in Berlin in 1737

Johann Friedrich Walther (14 June 1695 – 29 July 1776) was a German teacher, organist and draughtsman.

== Life ==
Born in Berlin, Walther was a pupil and teacher at the Garnisonschule in Berlin from 1716 to 1747. In 1716, he also became the school's organist, succeeding Johann Martin Weiß. In 1722, he was entrusted with the organ of the new Garnisonkirche. In addition to his full-time work, he wrote books and added his own drawings to them. He published a first history of the Garrison Church in 1737 and of the Sebastian Church in 1757. In 1747 Walther was appointed chamberlain.

Walther died in Berlin at the age of 81.

== Work ==
Walther produced numerous drawings and plans that served as models for the leading engravers of his time. His drawings of Martin Grünberg's buildings and other architects in Berlin are well-known.

- Die, In der Königl. Garnison-Kirche zu Berlin, befindliche Neue Orgel, Wie selbige, Nach ihrer äussern und innern Beschaffenheit erbauet, Mit wenigem beschrieben, Und Nebst einer kurtzen Vorrede, Vom Gebrauch, Kunst und Vortreflichkeit der Orgeln, zum Druck übergeben (PDF) (in German). Berlin. 1726.
- Die gute Hand Gottes über Die Garnison-Kirch- und Schul-Anstallten, in der Königlichen Preußischen Residentz Berlin, Oder Historische Nachricht Wenn und wie die Garnison-Kirche und Schule zuerst gestifftet und Deroselben Anstallten unter Göttlichen Segen bis auf gegenwärtige Zeit erhalten worden ... (in German). Berlin. 1737.
