= Cristoval Royas de Spinola =

Spanish diplomat and bishop (1626–1695)

Cristoval Royas de Spinola (or Christopher Rojas; born of a noble Spanish family, near Roermond in Gelderland in 1626; died at Wiener-Neustadt, 12 March 1695) was a Spanish Franciscan diplomat and Bishop of Wiener-Neustadt.

== Life ==
Educated at Cologne, Spinola entered the Franciscan Order there and for some time taught philosophy and theology. Going to Spain, he was made provincial of his order, and in 1661 accompanied Margaret Theresa of Spain, the first wife of Emperor Leopold I, to Vienna, where he became one of the emperor's influential diplomats.

Spinola was appointed titular Bishop of Knin, in Dalmatia, in 1668 and Bishop of Wiener-Neustadt on 19 January 1686. In his endeavours to bring about a reunion between Protestants and the Catholic Church he had the support of Leopold I. His negotiations with well-known Protestant theologians, such as Molanus, Callistus, Leibniz, etc., and various Protestant courts, especially Hanover and Brandenburg, were encouraged by Pope Innocent XI.

In 1683, Spinola's efforts led to a conference of Protestant theologians in Hanover. He submitted his plan of reunion, Regulae circa Christianorum, omnium ecclesiasticum reunionem, to the conference, where it received approval. Nevertheless, Innocent XI did not act on the plan, which the 1913 Catholic Encyclopedia attributes to a combination of French influence and Spinola's concessions.

About the same time, the Helmstedt theologians, represented by Gerhard Wolter Molanus, put forward their Methodus reducendae unionis. The discussions were approved by the pope and the emperor, but had no popular feeling behind them. Negotiations continued for ten years, especially between Molanus on the one side and Bossuet on the other, but no agreement was reached. The Protestants were unwilling to accept the Council of Trent as authoritative or surrender the matter of communion under both species.

On 20 March 1691, the emperor appointed Spinola commissary-general of the movement for ecclesiastical reunion in Austria-Hungary. The concessions which he now made to the Protestants of Austria-Hungary, such as Communion under both species, freedom for priests to marry, Mass in the German language, and suspension of the Tridentine decrees until a new council was held, were rejected by Rome.
