= 1758 =

1758 in various calendars
- Gregorian calendar: 1758; MDCCLVIII
- Ab urbe condita: 2511
- Armenian calendar: 1207; ԹՎ ՌՄԷ
- Assyrian calendar: 6508
- Balinese saka calendar: 1679–1680
- Bengali calendar: 1164–1165
- Berber calendar: 2708
- British Regnal year: 31 Geo. 2 – 32 Geo. 2
- Buddhist calendar: 2302
- Burmese calendar: 1120
- Byzantine calendar: 7266–7267
- Chinese calendar: 丁丑年 (Fire Ox); 4455 or 4248 — to — 戊寅年 (Earth Tiger); 4456 or 4249
- Coptic calendar: 1474–1475
- Discordian calendar: 2924
- Ethiopian calendar: 1750–1751
- Hebrew calendar: 5518–5519
- Hindu calendars
- Vikram Samvat: 1814–1815
- Shaka Samvat: 1679–1680
- Kali Yuga: 4858–4859
- Holocene calendar: 11758
- Igbo calendar: 758–759
- Iranian calendar: 1136–1137
- Islamic calendar: 1171–1172
- Japanese calendar: Hōreki 8 (宝暦８年)
- Javanese calendar: 1683–1684
- Julian calendar: Gregorian minus 11 days
- Korean calendar: 4091
- Minguo calendar: 154 before ROC 民前154年
- Nanakshahi calendar: 290
- Thai solar calendar: 2300–2301
- Tibetan calendar: མེ་མོ་གླང་ལོ་ (female Fire-Ox); 1884 or 1503 or 731 — to — ས་ཕོ་སྟག་ལོ་ (male Earth-Tiger); 1885 or 1504 or 732

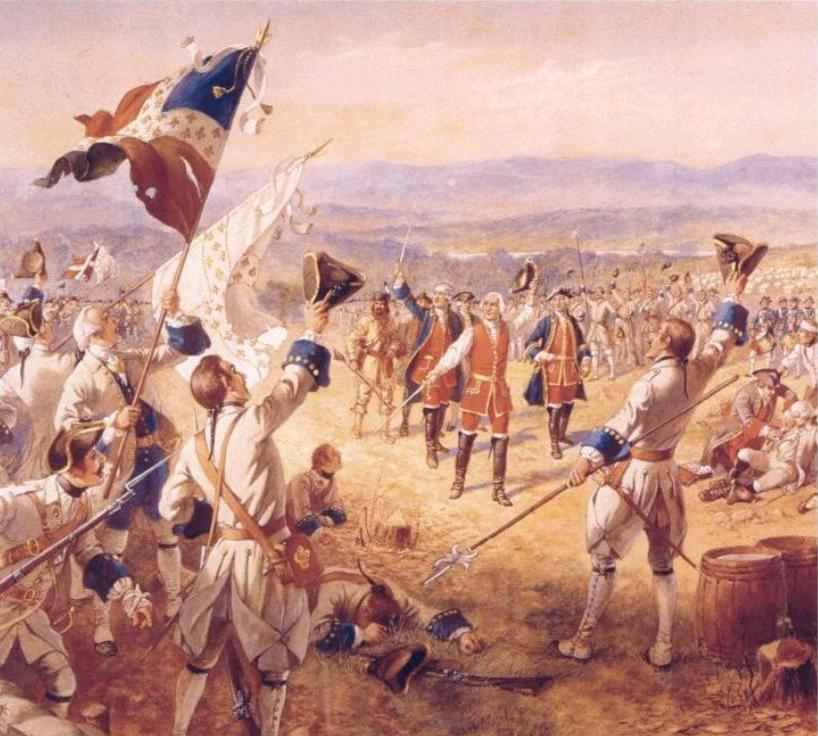
July 8: French forces inside the British Province of New York resist British attack in the Battle of Carillon.

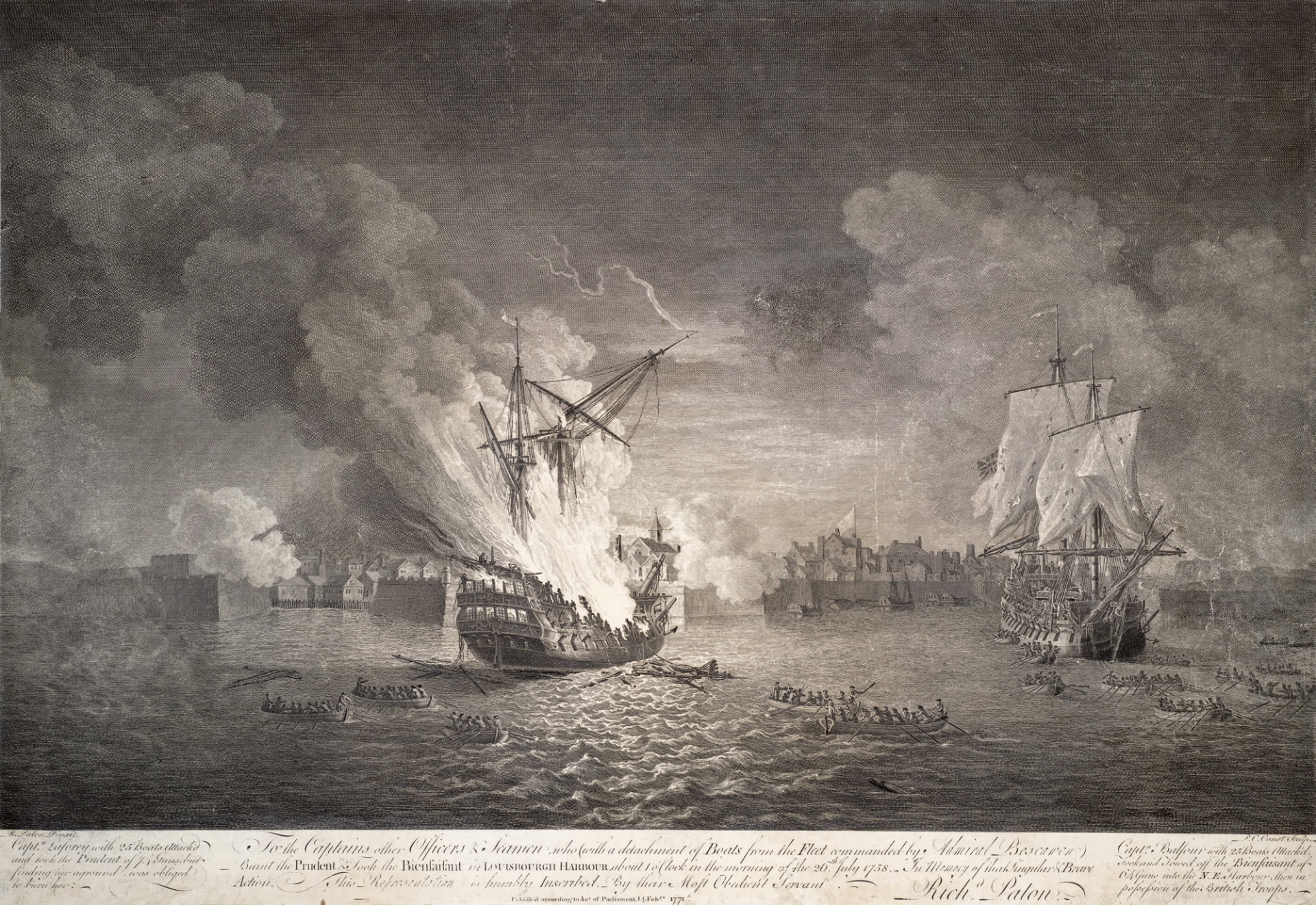
June 8: The Siege of Louisbourg begins in Nova Scotia.

1758 (MDCCLVIII) was a common year starting on Sunday of the Gregorian calendar and a common year starting on Thursday of the Julian calendar, the 1758th year of the Common Era (CE) and Anno Domini (AD) designations, the 758th year of the 2nd millennium, the 58th year of the 18th century, and the 9th year of the 1750s decade. As of the start of 1758, the Gregorian calendar was 11 days ahead of the Julian calendar, which remained in localized use until 1923.

== Events ==
=== January–March ===
- January 1 – Swedish biologist Carl Linnaeus (Carl von Linné) publishes in Stockholm the first volume (Animalia) of the 10th edition of Systema Naturae, the starting point of modern zoological nomenclature, introducing binomial nomenclature for animals to his established system of Linnaean taxonomy. Among the first examples of his system of identifying an organism by genus and then species, Linnaeus identifies the lamprey with the name Petromyzon marinus. He introduces the term Homo sapiens. (Date of January 1 assigned retrospectively.)
- January 20 – At Cap-Haïtien in Haiti, former slave turned rebel François Mackandal is executed by the French colonial government by being burned at the stake.
- January 22 – Russian troops under the command of William Fermor invade East Prussia and capture Königsberg with 34,000 soldiers; although the city is later abandoned by Russia after the Seven Years' War ends, the city again comes under Russian control in 1945 during World War II and is now named Kaliningrad.
- February 22 – A fleet of 158 British Royal Navy warships, under the command of Admiral Edward Boscawen, departs from Plymouth toward North America in an effort to conquer the French Canadian territories of New France. Many of the sailors die of nutritional deficiencies along the way, including the scurvy that kills 26 of the crew of HMS Pembroke, captained by future world explorer James Cook on his first long voyage.
- February 23 – Jonathan Edwards, the famed English theologian who had assumed the presidency of what is now Princeton University only a week earlier, sets an example for students and faculty by publicly receiving an inoculation against smallpox. Unfortunately, the vaccine contains live smallpox; Edwards develops the disease and dies on March 22 at the age of 54.
- March 16 – Members of the Comanche Nation loot and destroy the Spanish Mission Santa Cruz de San Sabá (near modern-day Menard, Texas) and kill eight of the people there, including the mission leader, Father Alonso Giraldo de Terreros.

=== April–June ===
- April 29 – Battle of Cuddalore: A British fleet under Sir George Pocock engages the French fleet of Anne Antoine, Comte d'Aché indecisively near Madras.
- May 21 – Seven Years' War – French and Indian War: Mary Campbell is abducted from her home in Pennsylvania by members of the Lenape Nation.
- June 8 – Seven Years' War – French and Indian War: Siege of Louisbourg: James Wolfe's attack at Louisbourg, Nova Scotia, commences.

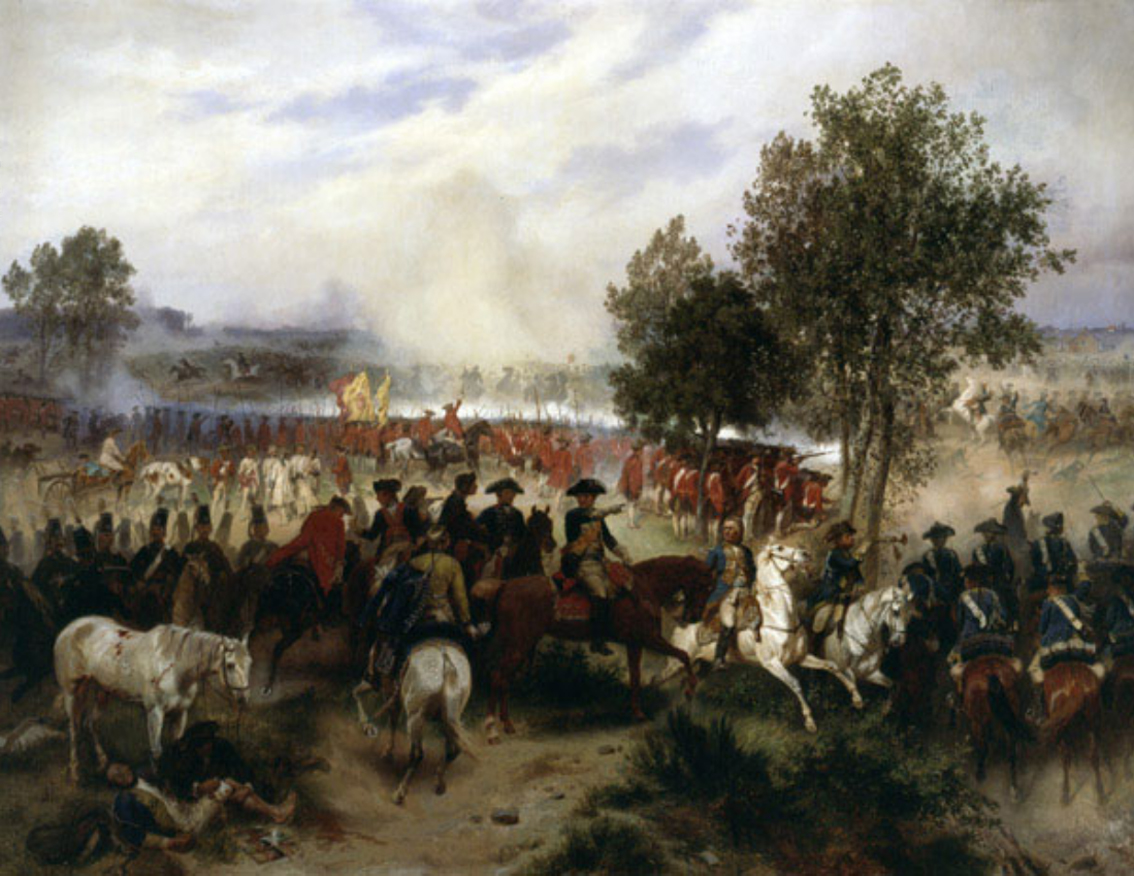
June 23: Battle of Krefeld

- June 9–10 – Spanish-Barbary Wars – Battle of Cape Palos: a Spanish squadron of three ships of the line defeats a Barbary squadron made up of a ship of the line and a frigate.
- June 23 – Seven Years' War – Battle of Krefeld: Anglo-Hanoverian forces under Ferdinand of Brunswick defeat the French.
- June 30 – Seven Years' War – Battle of Domstadtl: Austrian forces under Ernst Gideon von Laudon and Joseph von Siskovits rout an enormous convoy with supplies for the Prussian army, guarded by strong troops of Hans Joachim von Zieten.

=== July–September ===
- July 6
  - Pope Clement XIII succeeds Pope Benedict XIV, as the 248th pope.
  - Seven Years' War – Battle of Bernetz Brook: British troops defeat the French.
- July 8 – Seven Years' War: French and Indian War: French forces hold Fort Carillon against the British at Ticonderoga, New York.
- July 25 – Seven Years' War – French and Indian War: The island battery at Fortress Louisbourg is silenced, and all French warships are destroyed or taken.
- August 3 – Seven Years' War – Battle of Negapatam: Off the coast of India, Admiral Pocock again engages d'Aché's French fleet, this time with more success.

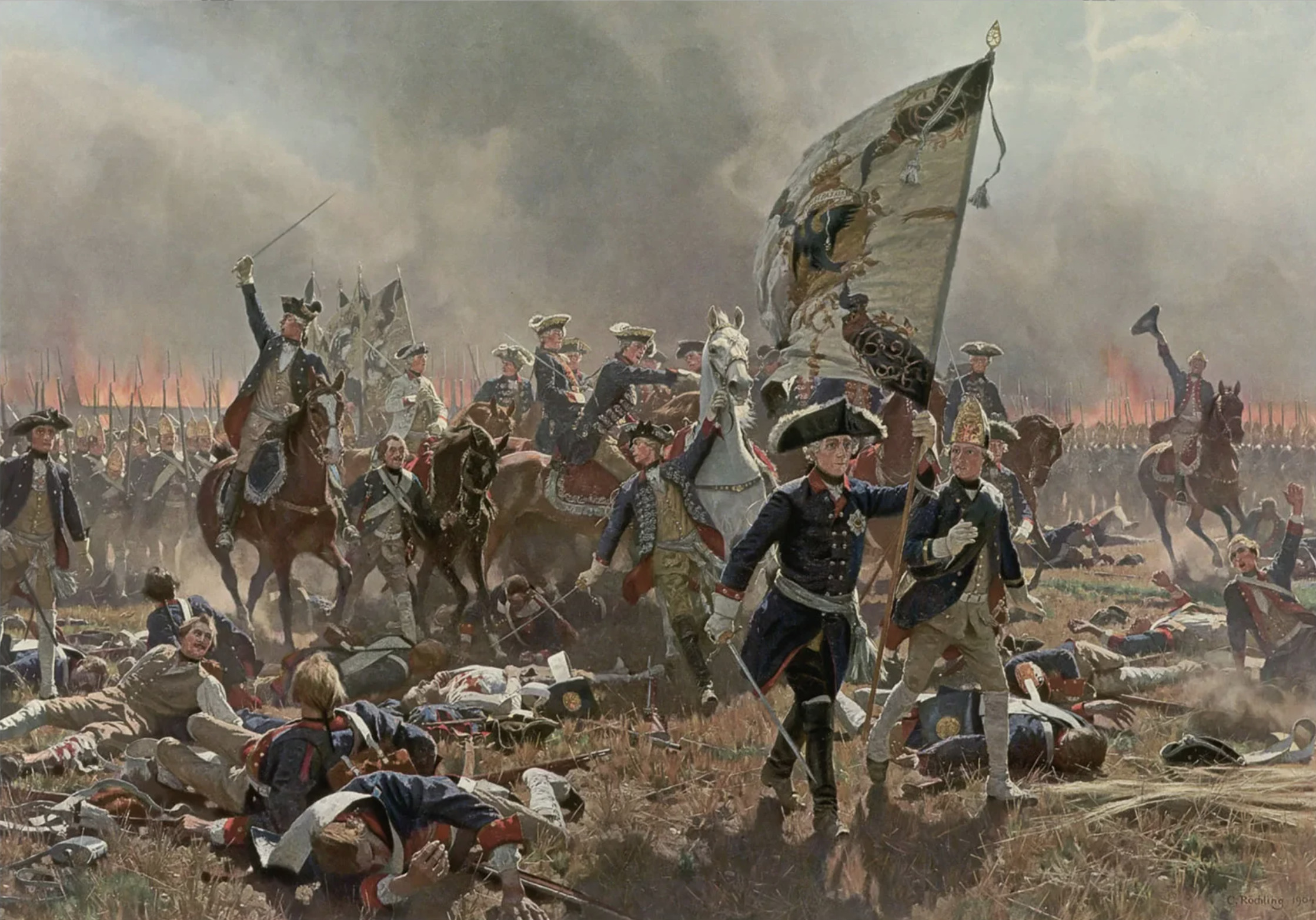
August 25: Battle of Zorndorf

- August 25 – Seven Years' War – Battle of Zorndorf: Frederick halts the Russian army of Count Wilhelm Fermor near the Oder.
- August 27 – Seven Years' War – British troops under the command of Colonel John Bradstreet capture Fort Frontenac (near the site of what is now Kingston, Ontario) from the French.
- September 3 – Távora affair: Joseph I of Portugal survives an assassination attempt.
- September 14 – Seven Years' War – French and Indian War: Battle of Fort Duquesne: A British attack on Fort Duquesne (modern-day Pittsburgh) is defeated.

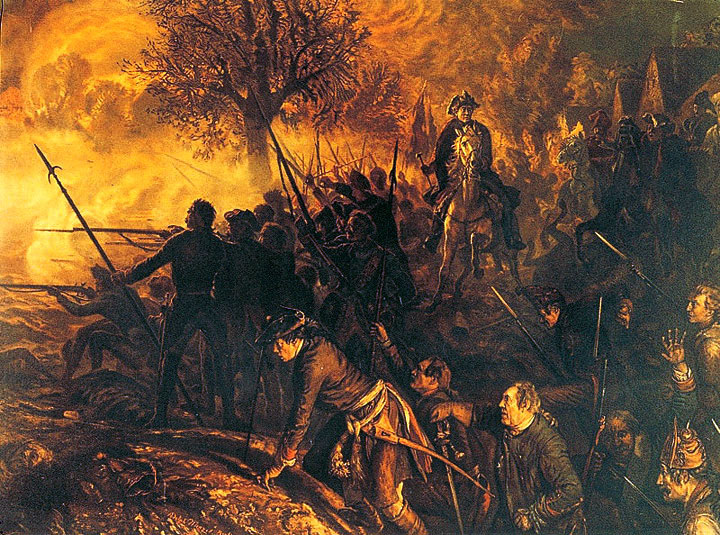
October 14: Battle of Hochkirch

=== October–December ===
- October 14 – Seven Years' War: Battle of Hochkirch: Frederick loses a hard-fought battle against the Austrians under Marshal Leopold von Daun, who besieges Dresden.
- November 25 – Seven Years' War: French and Indian War: French forces abandon Fort Duquesne to the British, who then name the area Pittsburgh.
- December 13 – The ship Duke William sinks in the North Atlantic, with the loss of over 360 lives, while deporting Acadians from Prince Edward Island to France.
- December 25 – Halley's Comet is sighted by Johann Georg Palitzsch, confirming Edmund Halley's 1705 prediction of its periodicity.

=== Date unknown ===
- The French build the first European settlement in what becomes Erie County, New York, at the mouth of Buffalo Creek.
- Rudjer Boscovich publishes his atomic theory, in Theoria philosophiae naturalis redacta ad unicam legem virium in nalura existentium.
- A fire destroys parts of Christiania, Norway.
- Marquis Gabriel de Lernay, a French officer captured during the Seven Years' War, establishes a military lodge in Berlin, with the help of Baron de Printzen, master of The Three Globes Lodge at Berlin, and Philipp Samuel Rosa, a disgraced former pastor.
- Okadaya (岡田屋), predecessor of AEON, a multiple retailer group, founded in Yokkaichi, Japan.
- J. R. Geigy, predecessor of Novartis, a global pharmaceutical brand, founded in Basel, Switzerland.

== Births ==
- January 6 – Charles Ganilh, French economist, politician (d. 1836)
- January 9 – George Leveson-Gower, 1st Duke of Sutherland, born Viscount Trentham, British politician and landowner (d. 1833)
- January 11 – François Louis Bourdon, French Revolutionary politician (d. 1797)
- January 17 – Marie Anne Simonis, Belgian textile industrialist (d. 1831)
- January 20 – Marie-Anne Pierrette Paulze, French chemist (d. 1836)
- January 24 – Frederick Ponsonby, 3rd Earl of Bessborough (d. 1844)
- February 1 – David Ochterlony, Massachusetts-born general with the East India Company (d. 1825)
- February 3
  - Francis Napier, 8th Lord Napier of Great Britain (d. 1823)
  - Vasily Kapnist, Ukrainian poet, playwright (d. 1823)
- February 4 – George Thicknesse, 19th Baron Audley, English peer (d. 1818)
- February 10 – Amalia Holst, German writer, intellectual and feminist (d. 1829)
- February 17 – John Pinkerton, British antiquarian (d. 1826)
- February 28 – Nicolas François, Count Mollien, French financier (d. 1850)
- March 9 – Franz Joseph Gall, German pioneering neuroanatomist (d. 1828)
- March 12 – Leopold Karel, Count of Limburg Stirum (d. 1840)
- March 15 – Magdalene Sophie Buchholm, Norwegian poet (d. 1826)
- April 4
  - John Hoppner, English portrait-painter (d. 1810)
  - Pierre-Paul Prud'hon, French painter (d. 1823)
- April 16 – Christian Karl August Ludwig von Massenbach, Prussian soldier (d. 1827)
- April 22 – Francisco Javier Castaños, 1st Duke of Bailén, Spanish general (d. 1852)
- April 23
  - Alexander Hood, British Royal Navy officer (k. 1798)
  - Alexander Cochrane, British Royal Navy officer (d. 1832)
  - Philip Gidley King, British Royal Navy officer, colonial administrator (d. 1808)
- April 27 – Charles Dumont de Sainte-Croix, French zoologist (d. 1830)

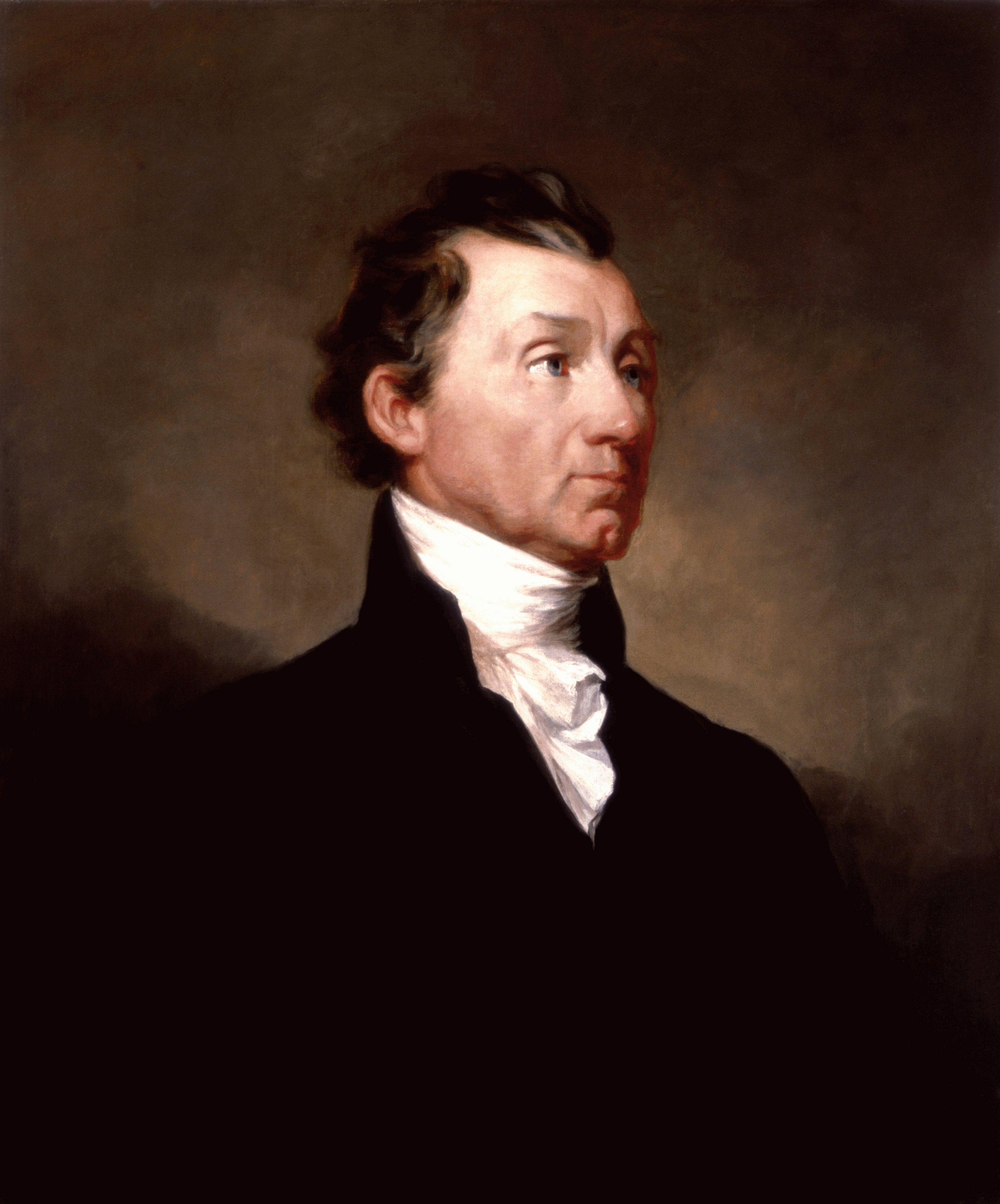
James Monroe

- April 28 – James Monroe, fifth President of the United States (d. 1831)
- April 29 – Georg Carl von Döbeln, Swedish officer, general and war hero (d. 1820)
- April 30
  - Emmanuel Vitale, Maltese military leader (d. 1802)
  - Jane West, English writer (d. 1852)

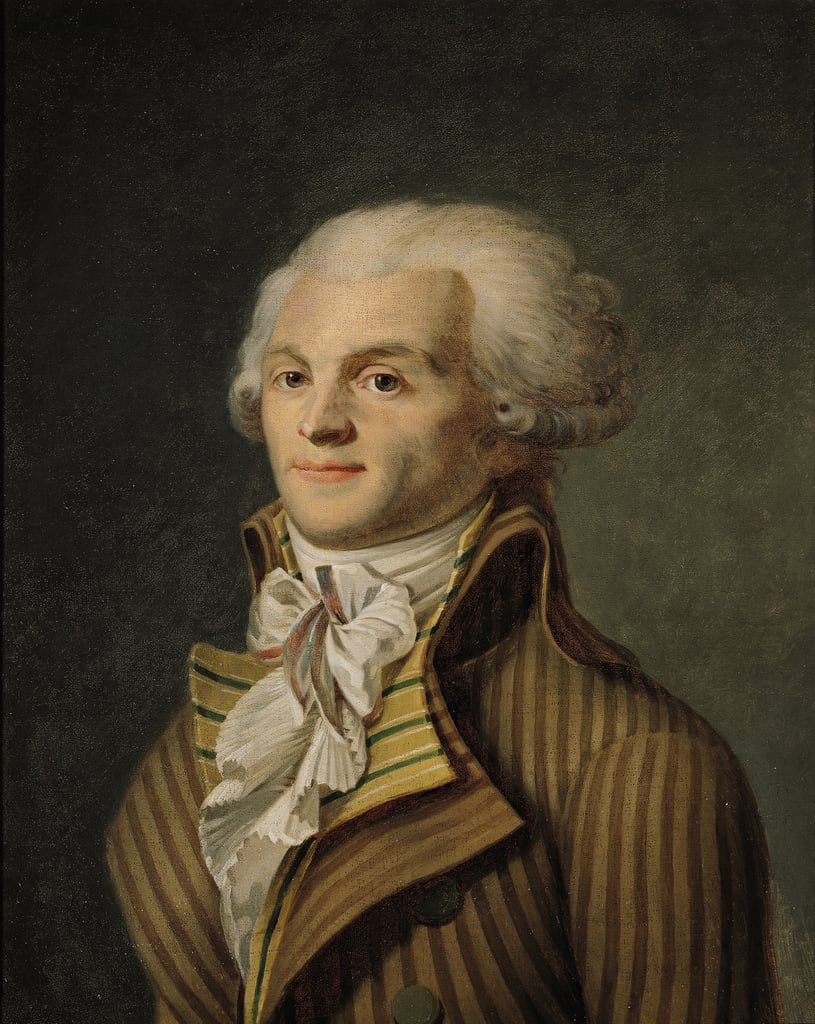
Maximilien Robespierre

- May 6
  - Maximilien Robespierre, French revolutionary (d. 1794)
  - André Masséna, Napoleonic general, Marshal of France (d. 1817)
- May 8 – John Heath, U.S. Representative for Virginia (d. 1810)
- May 15 – Thomas Taylor, English neoplatonist translator (d. 1835)
- May 17
  - Sir John St Aubyn, 5th Baronet, English fossil collector (d. 1839)
  - Honoré IV, Prince of Monaco (d. 1819)
- June 19 – Raffaello Sanzio Morghen, Italian engraver (d. 1833)
- June 29 – Clotilde Tambroni, Italian philologist, linguist (d. 1817)
- July 25 – Elizabeth Hamilton, English writer (d. 1816)
- July 31 – Rosalie de Constant, Swiss naturalist (d. 1834)
- July 31 – Jeremiah Colegrove, U.S. farmer, manufacturer and soldier (d. 1836)
- August 5 – Emperor Go-Momozono of Japan (d. 1779)
- August 14 – Carle Vernet, French painter (d. 1835)

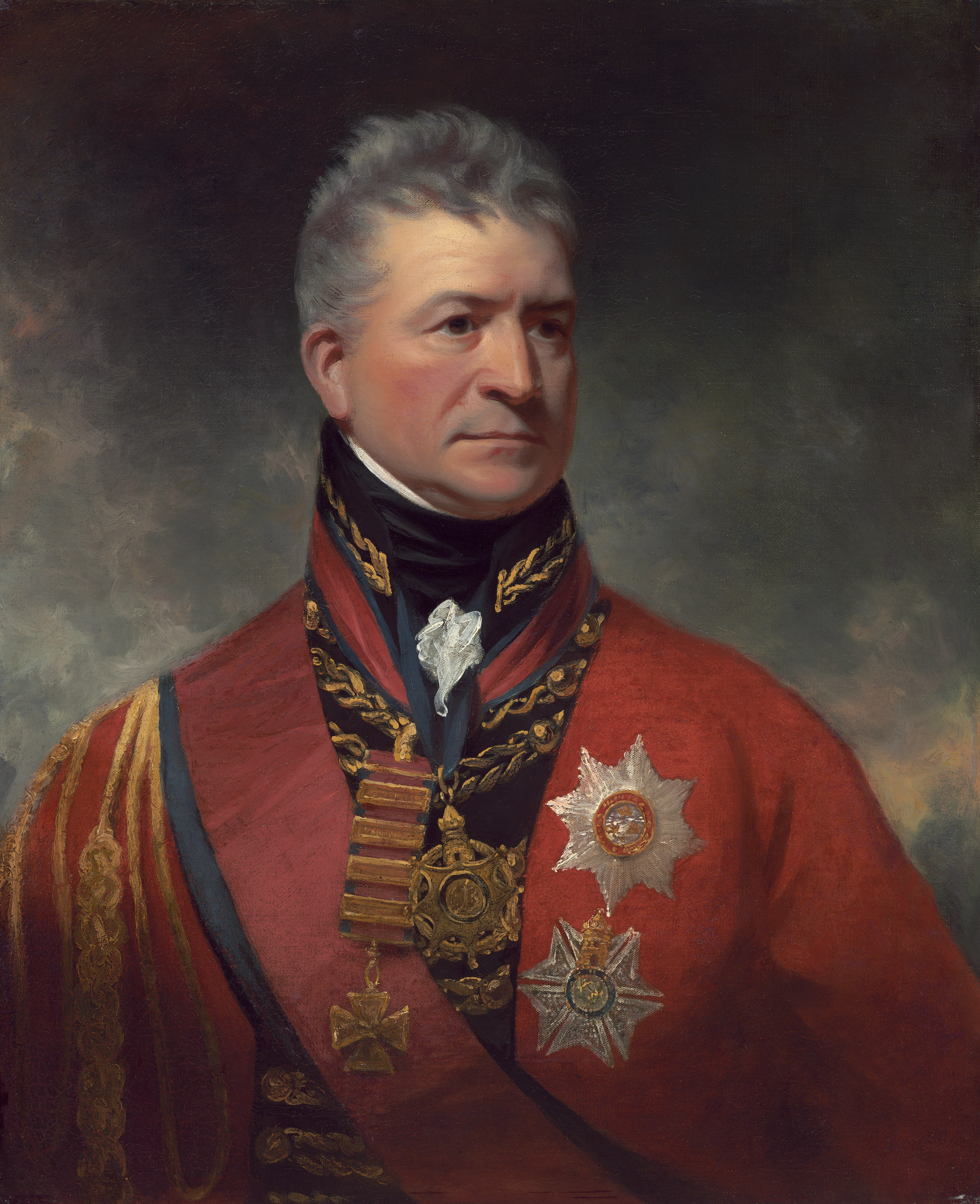
Thomas Picton

- August 24 – Thomas Picton, British soldier, colonial governor (k. 1815)
- August 25 – Israel Pellew, English naval officer (d. 1832)
- September 9 – Alexander Nasmyth, Scottish portrait and landscape painter (d. 1840)
- September 10 – Hannah Webster Foster, U.S. novelist (d. 1840)
- September 18 – Louis Friant, French Napoleonic soldier (d. 1829)
- September 20 – Jean-Jacques Dessalines, leader of the Haitian Revolution (d. 1806)

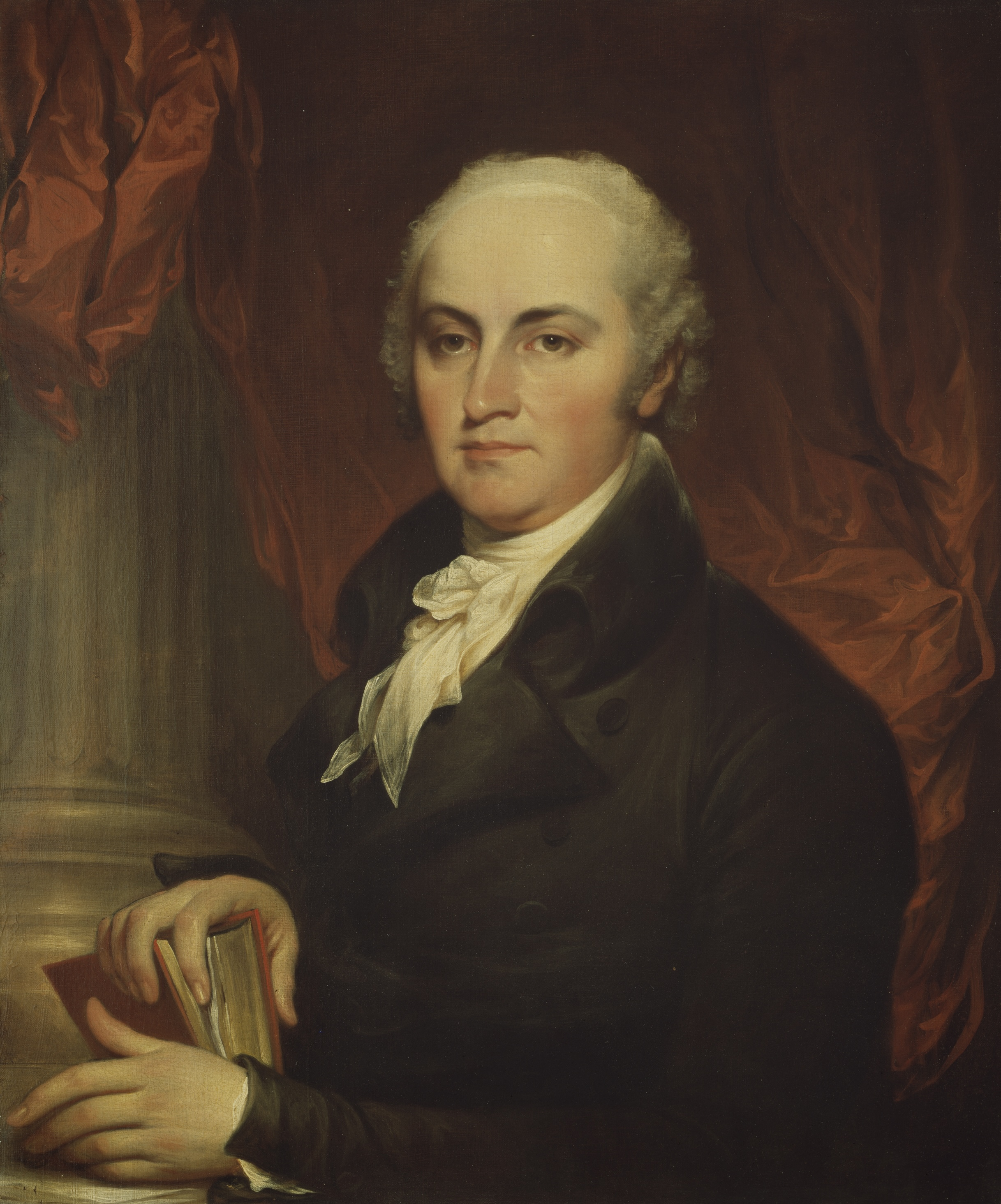
Christopher Gore

- September 21
  - Antoine Isaac Silvestre de Sacy, French linguist, orientalist (d. 1838)
  - Christopher Gore, U.S. lawyer, politician (d. 1827)
- September 25 – Maria Anna Thekla Mozart called Marianne, known as Bäsle ("little cousin"), cousin of Wolfgang Amadeus Mozart (d. 1841)
- September 26 – Cosme Argerich, Argentine Surgeon General (d. 1820)

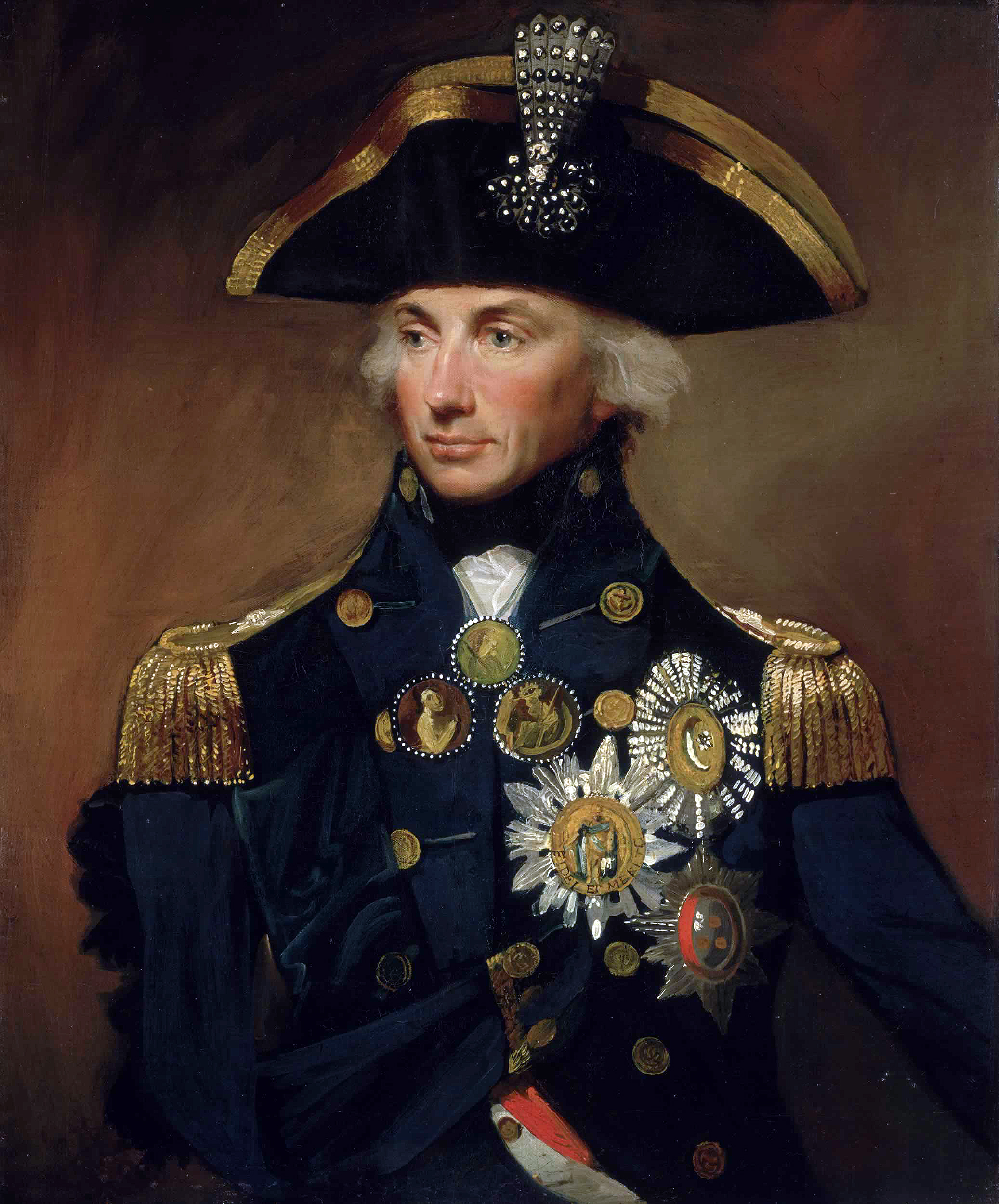
Horatio Nelson, 1st Viscount Nelson

- September 29
  - Horatio Nelson, 1st Viscount Nelson, British admiral (d. 1805)
  - Fanny von Arnstein, Austrian salonnière (d. 1818)
- October 5 – Seymour Fleming, British noblewoman (d. 1818)
- October 6 – Watkin Tench, British Marine officer (d. 1833)
- October 11 – Heinrich Wilhelm Matthias Olbers, German astronomer (d. 1840)
- October 15 – Johann Heinrich von Dannecker, German sculptor (d. 1841)

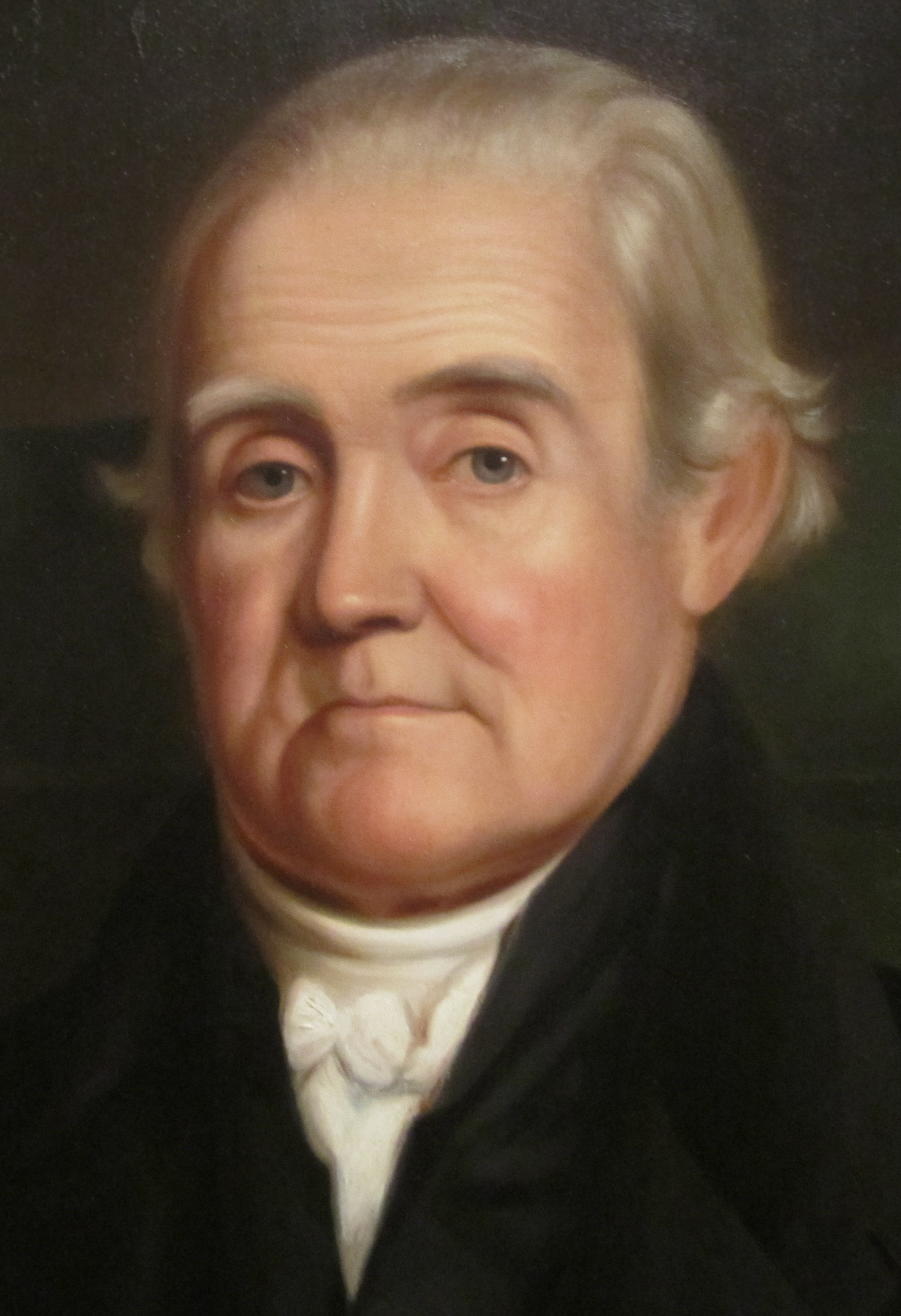
Noah Webster

- October 16 – Noah Webster, U.S. lexicographer (d. 1843)
- October 22/6 – Vincenzo Dandolo, Italian chemist, agriculturist (d. 1819)
- October 28 – John Sibthorp, English botanist (d. 1796)
- October 28 – Joseph-François-Louis-Charles de Damas, French general (d. 1829)
- October 31 – Thomas Gisborne, Anglican priest, abolitionist (d. 1846)
- November 5 – Louis-Marie Aubert du Petit-Thouars, French botanist (d. 1831)
- November 11
  - Carl Friedrich Zelter, German composer (d. 1832)
  - Caleb P. Bennett, U.S. soldier, politician (d. 1836)
- November 14 – William Bradley, British Royal Navy officer and cartographer (d. 1833)
- November 16 – Peter Andreas Heiberg, Danish author, philologist (d. 1841)
- December 5 – George Beauclerk, 4th Duke of St Albans (d. 1787)
- December 9 – Richard Colt Hoare, English antiquarian, archaeologist (d. 1838)
- December 21 – Jean Baptiste Eblé, French general (d. 1812)

=== Date unknown ===
- Georges Antoine Chabot, French jurist, statesman (d. 1819)
- Nicholas Fish, U.S. Revolutionary soldier (d. 1833)
- Anthimos Gazis, Greek scholar, philosopher (d. 1828)
- Samuel Hardy, U.S. lawyer and statesman from Virginia (d. 1785)
- Jamphel Gyatso, 8th Dalai Lama of Tibet (d. 1804)
- Charles Lee, U.S. Attorney General (d. 1815)
- Samuel Sterett, American politician, U.S. Representative for Maryland (d. 1833)
- Marie-Claire Heureuse Félicité, Empress of Haiti (d. 1858)

=== Probable ===
- Kamehameha I, King of Hawaii (d. c. 1819)

== Deaths ==
- January 7 – Allan Ramsay, Scottish poet (b. 1686)
- January 17 – James Hamilton, 6th Duke of Hamilton, Scottish peer (b. 1724)
- January 18 – François Nicole, French mathematician (b. 1683)
- February 10 – Thomas Ripley, English architect (b. 1683)
- March 2 – Pierre Guérin de Tencin, French cardinal (b. 1679)
- March 6 – Henry Vane, 1st Earl of Darlington, English politician (b. c. 1705)
- March 18
  - Matthew Hutton, Archbishop of Canterbury (b. 1693)
  - Thomas Zebrowski, Lithuanian Jesuit scientist (b. 1714)

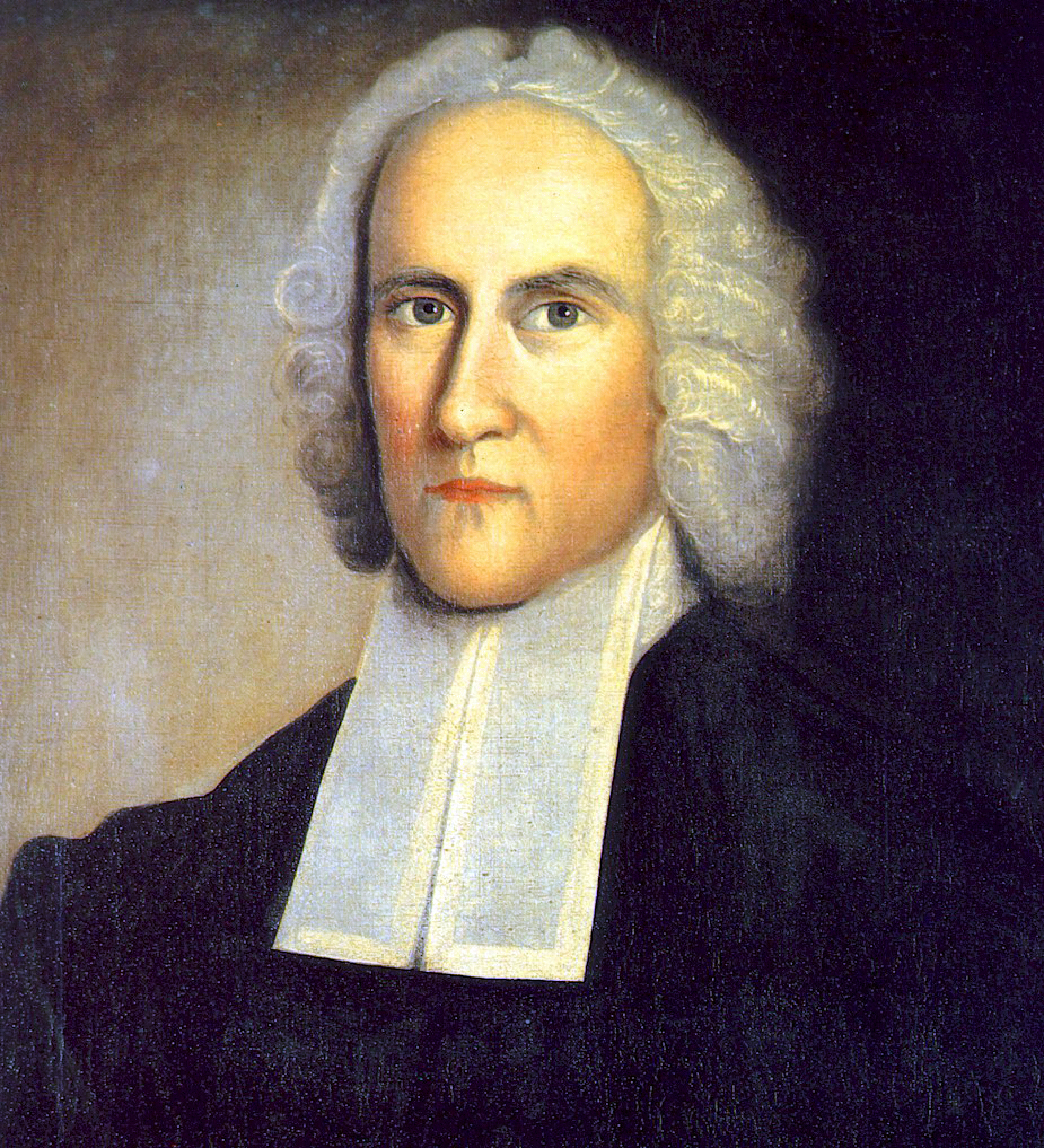
Jonathan Edwards

- March 22
  - Jonathan Edwards, American minister (b. 1703)
  - Richard Leveridge, English bass and composer (b. 1670)
- April 7 – Joseph Blanchard, American soldier (b. 1704)
- April 21 – Francesco Zerafa, Maltese architect (b. 1679)
- April 22 – Antoine de Jussieu, French naturalist (b. 1686)
- April 30 – François d'Agincourt, French composer (b. 1684)
- May 3 – Pope Benedict XIV (b. 1675)
- May 28 – Ernest Augustus II of Saxe-Weimar-Eisenach (b. 1737)
- May 31 – Marguerite de Lussan, French historical novelist (b. 1682)
- June 9 – Antonio de los Reyes Correa, Puerto Rican soldier (b. c. 1665)
- June 12 – Prince Augustus William of Prussia (b. 1722)
- July 6 – George Howe, 3rd Viscount Howe, British general (in battle) (b. c. 1725)

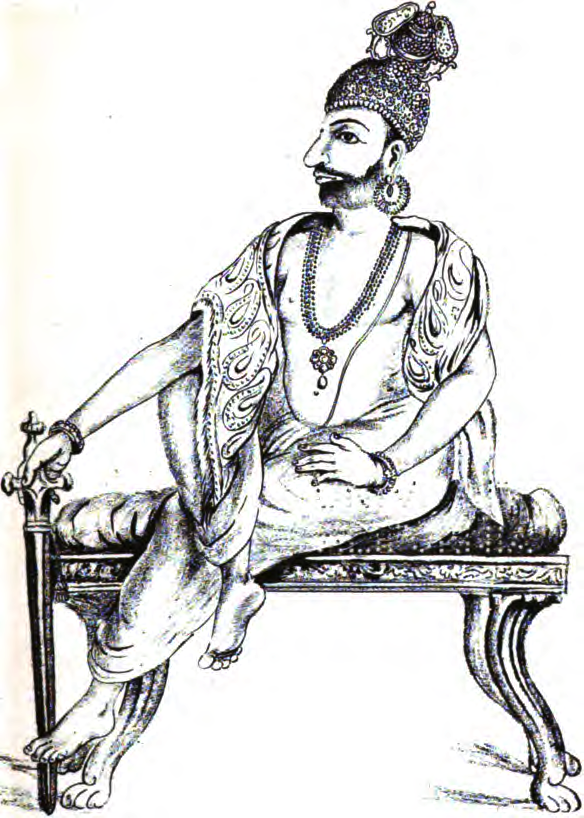
Marthanda Varma

- July 7 – Marthanda Varma, Rani of Attingal (b. 1706)
- July 15 – Ambrosius Stub, Danish poet (b. 1705)
- July 18 – Duncan Campbell, Scottish soldier
- August 2 – George Booth, 2nd Earl of Warrington, English noble (b. 1675)
- August 15 – Pierre Bouguer, French mathematician (b. 1698)
- August 17 – Stepan Fyodorovich Apraksin, Russian soldier (b. 1702)
- August 23 – Ulrika Eleonora von Düben, Swedish lady in waiting (b. 1722)
- August 27 – Barbara of Portugal, Princess of Portugal and Queen of Spain (b. 1711)
- September 5 – Dmitry Ivanovich Vinogradov, Russian chemist (b. c. 1720)
- September 15 – Adina Beg Khan, Nawab of Punjab (b. 1710)
- September 23 – John FitzPatrick, 1st Earl of Upper Ossory (b. 1719)
- October 2 (bur.) – Philip Southcote, English landscape gardener (b. 1698)
- October 12 – Richard Molesworth, 3rd Viscount Molesworth, British field marshal (b. 1680)

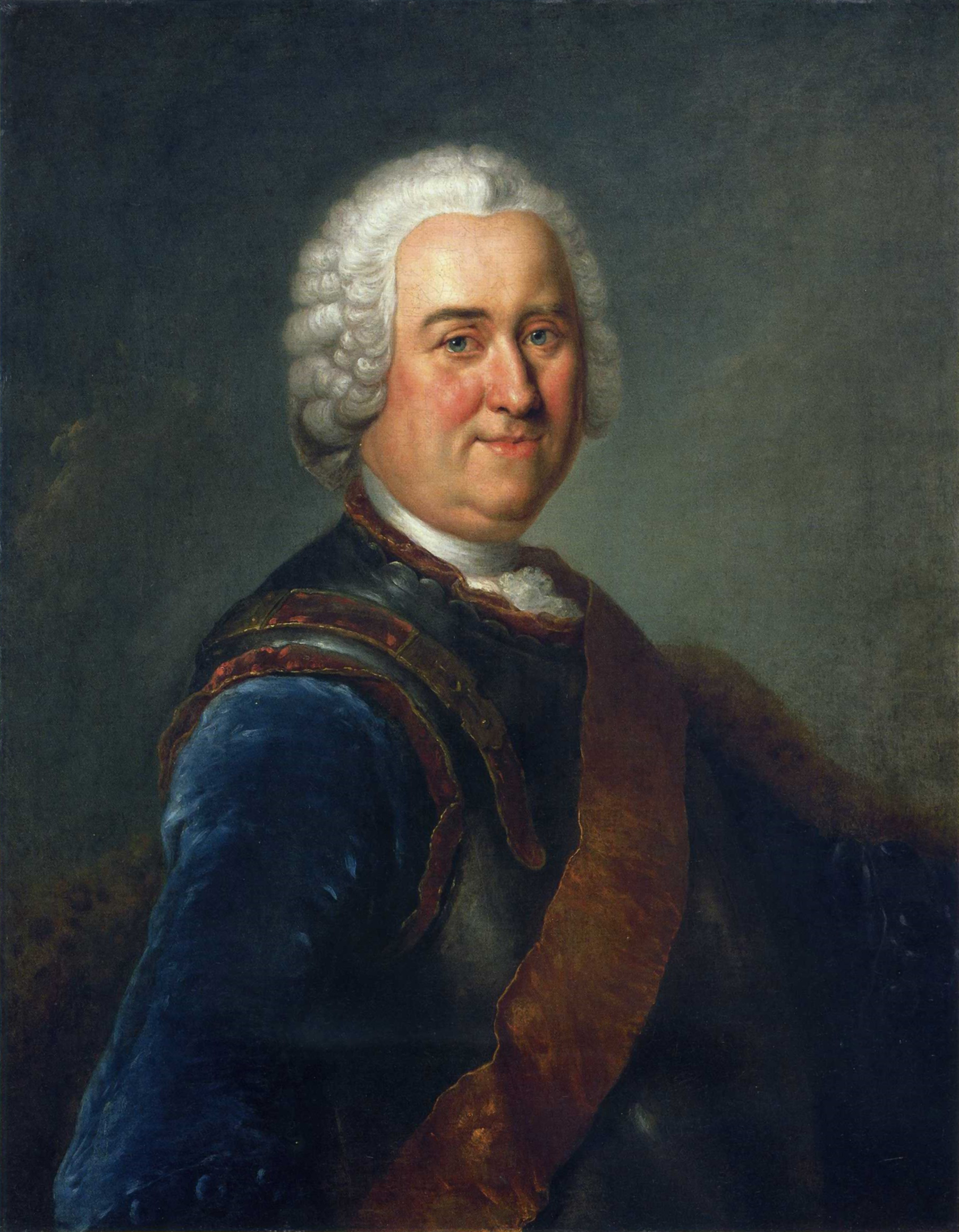
James Francis Edward Keith

- October 14
  - Wilhelmine, Margravine of Brandenburg-Bayreuth, daughter of Friedrich Wilhelm I of Prussia (b. 1709)
  - James Francis Edward Keith, Scottish soldier and Prussian field marshal (b. 1696)
- October 20 – Charles Spencer, 3rd Duke of Marlborough, British politician (b. 1706)
- October 25/8 – Theophilus Cibber, English actor (b. 1703)
- November 5 – Hans Egede, Norwegian Lutheran missionary (b. 1686)
- November 12 – John Cockburn, Scottish politician (b. c. 1679)
- November 20 – Johan Helmich Roman, Swedish composer (b. 1694)
- November 22 – Richard Edgcumbe, 1st Baron Edgcumbe, English politician (b. 1680)
- November 27 – Senesino, Italian singer (b. 1686)
- December 5 – Johann Friedrich Fasch, German composer (b. 1688)

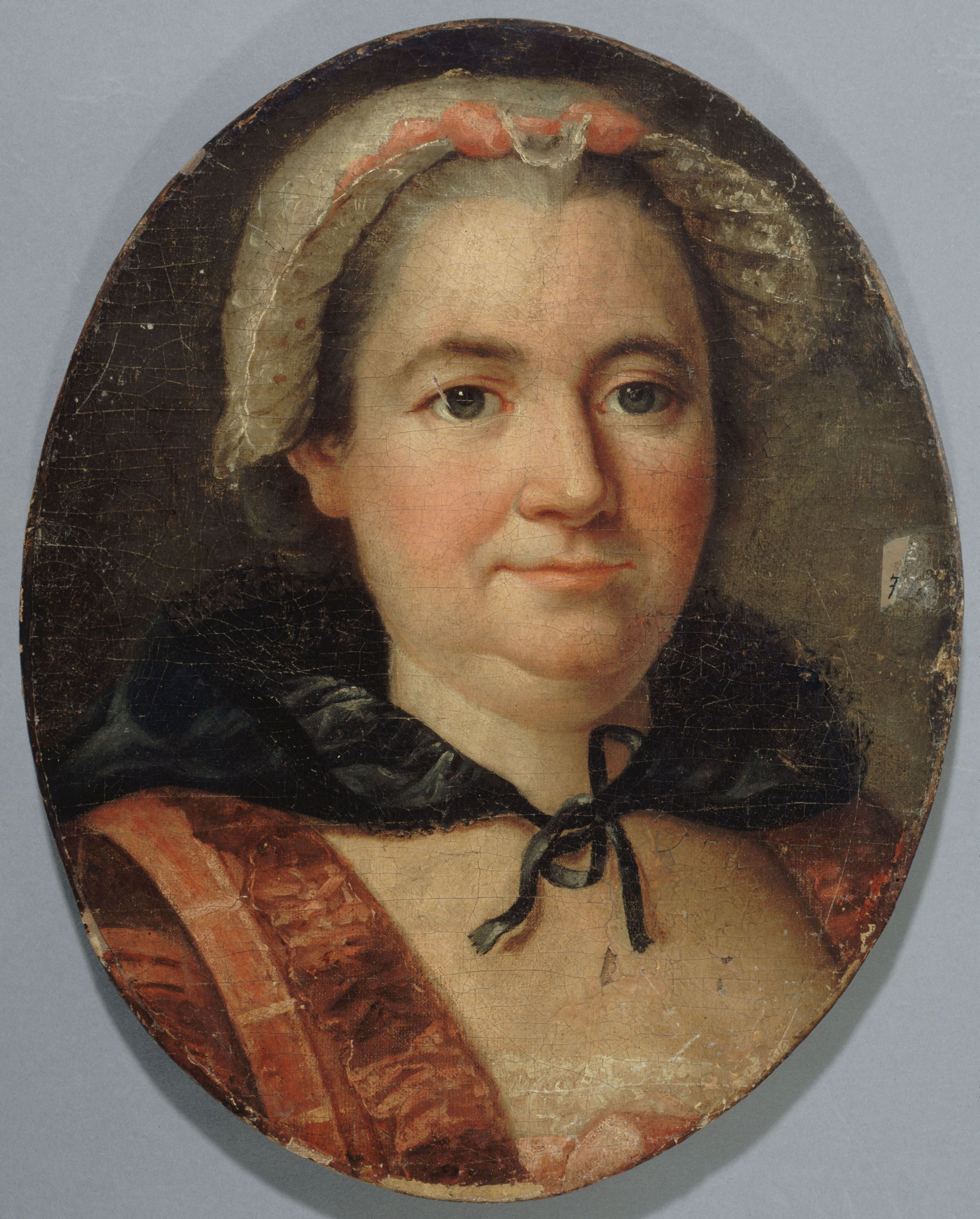
Françoise de Graffigny

- December 12 – Françoise de Graffigny, French lettrist (b. 1695)
- December 16 – Andrzej Stanisław Załuski, Polish-Lithuanian bishop (b. 1695)
- December 17 – Charles Butler, 1st Earl of Arran, Anglo-Irish noble (b. 1671)
- December 25 – James Hervey, English clergyman, writer (b. 1714)
- December 26 – François Joseph Lagrange-Chancel, French dramatist, satirist (b. 1677)

=== Date unknown ===
- François Mackandal, Haitian revolutionary leader, burned at the stake (b. c. 1730)
- Nathaniel Meserve, American shipwright (b. 1704)
- Hyder Ali and his Sepoy capture Bangalore from "Khande Rao of the Maratha Confederacy". (Part of the Seven Years' War).
- Verónica II Guterres, African monarch
