= Echohawk (disambiguation) =

Echohawk was a Pawnee leader, whose name became a surname. It can also refer to:

== People ==
- Brummett T. Echohawk, Pawnee painter
- Bunky Echo–Hawk, Yakama-Pawnee artist
- John EchoHawk, Pawnee attorney and founder of the Native American Rights Fund
- Larry Echo Hawk, Pawnee attorney and former head of the Bureau of Indian Affairs

== Other ==
- Echohawk, an historical novel by Lynda Durrant
