= Colegrove =

Colegrove may refer to:

- Colegrove (surname), surname (includes list)
- Colegrove, Los Angeles, settlement now part of Hollywood
- Colegrove, Pennsylvania
- Colegrove v. Green
