= Sharon Conglomerate =

Geologic formation in the United States

- Stratigraphic range: Pennsylvanian
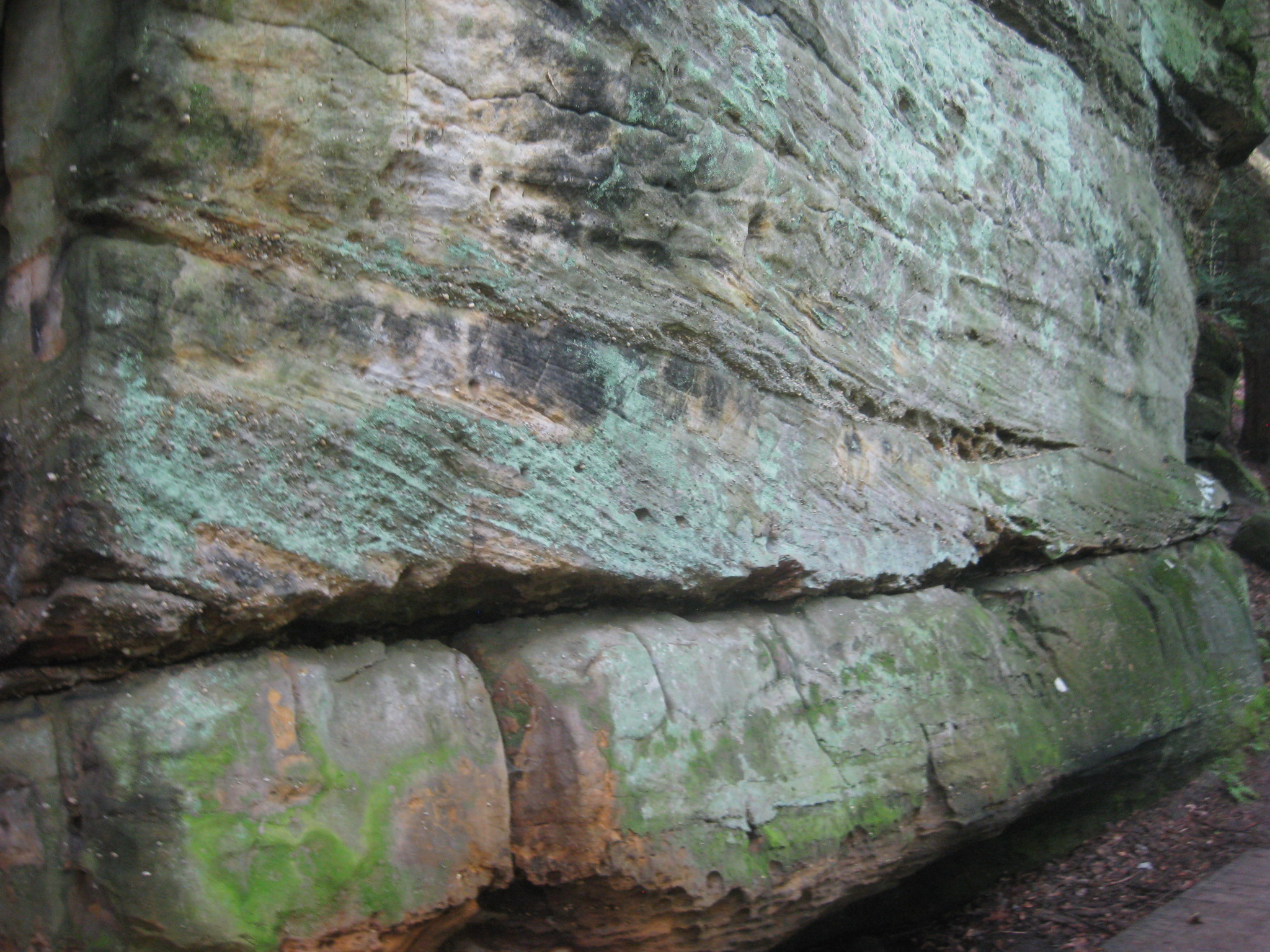
- Outcrop of the Sharon Conglomerate at the Ledges, Cuyahoga Valley National Park
- Type: Sedimentary
- Unit of: Pottsville Formation
- Overlies: Meadville Shale

Lithology
- Primary: conglomerate

Location
- Region: Pennsylvania
- Country: United States
- Extent: Pennsylvania, Ohio, Maryland

Type section
- Named for: Sharon, Pennsylvania

The Sharon Conglomerate is a geologic formation of early Pennsylvanian age in Pennsylvania, Ohio, and Maryland, in the United States. It is dominantly conglomerate and quartzarenite sandstone. In places it is abundantly crossbedded.

The Sharon Conglomerate is generally considered a Member of the Pottsville Formation in Pennsylvania and Maryland, but it is a Formation in Ohio.

== Exposures ==
The Sharon conglomerate has no formal type section, although it is named after the town of Sharon, Pennsylvania.

One excellent exposure is located in Cuyahoga Valley National Park at "the Ledges," located southeast of the town of Peninsula, Ohio. Another exposure is at Mary Campbell Cave near Cuyahoga Falls.

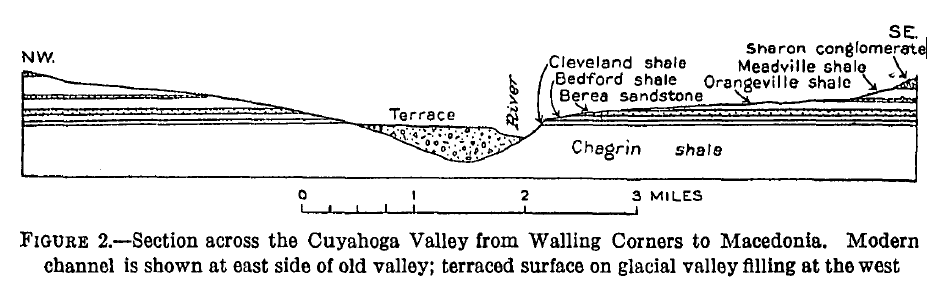
Geologic cross section at Cuyahoga Valley National Park showing the Sharon Conglomerate at upper right (stratigraphic top).

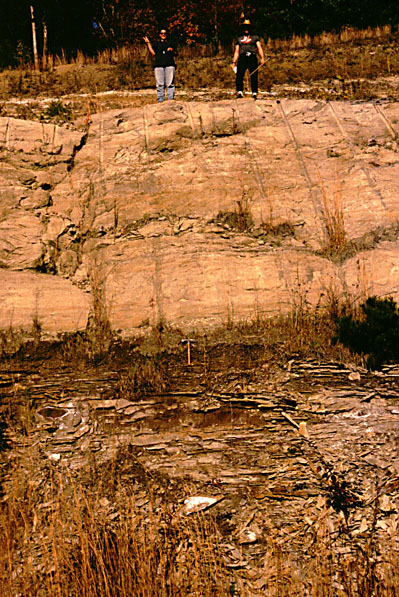
Outcrop near Jackson, Ohio showing the Sharon unconformably overlying the Borden Formation

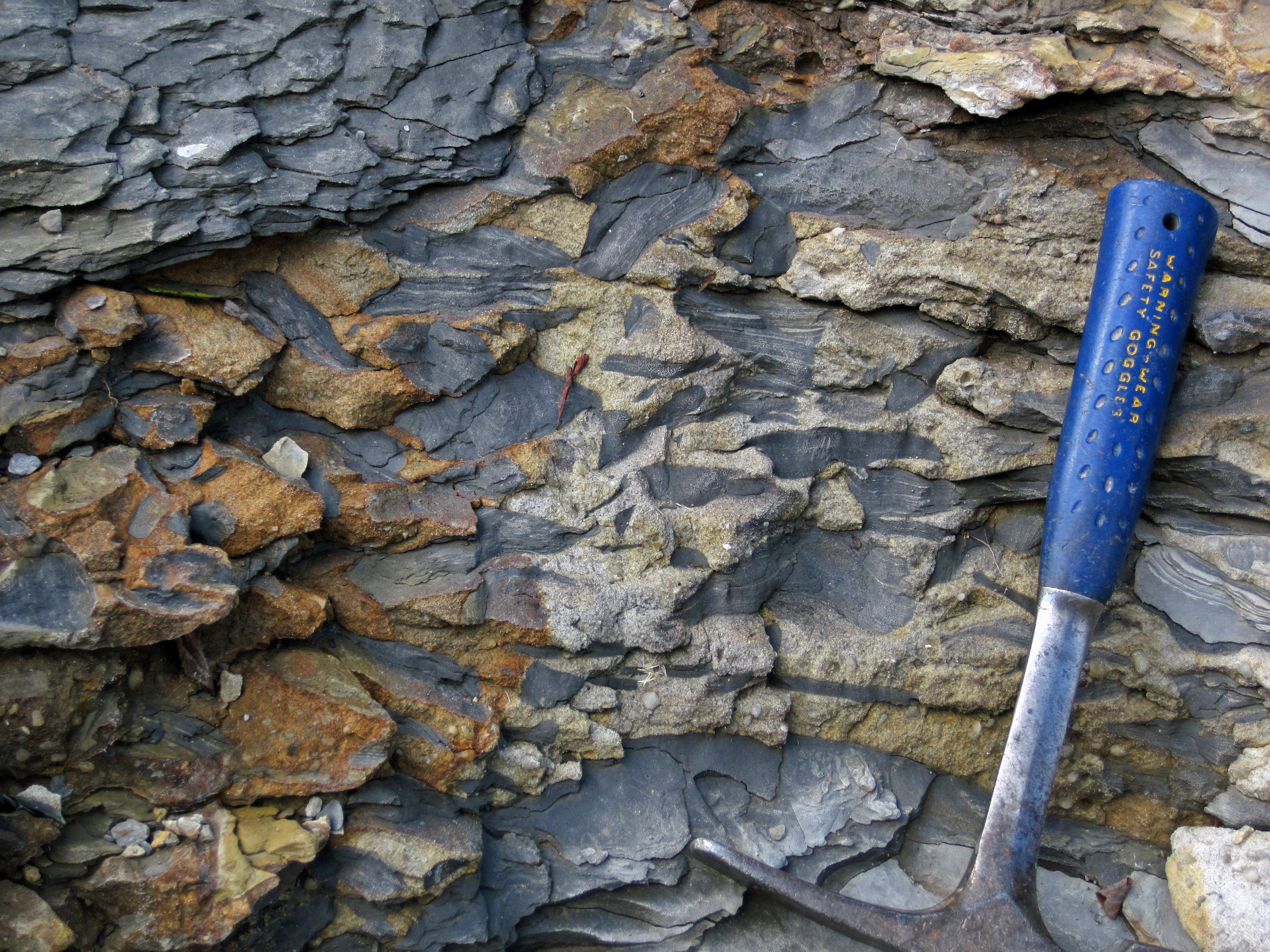
Mudshale clasts in one of the roadcuts near Jackson. Rock hammer for scale.

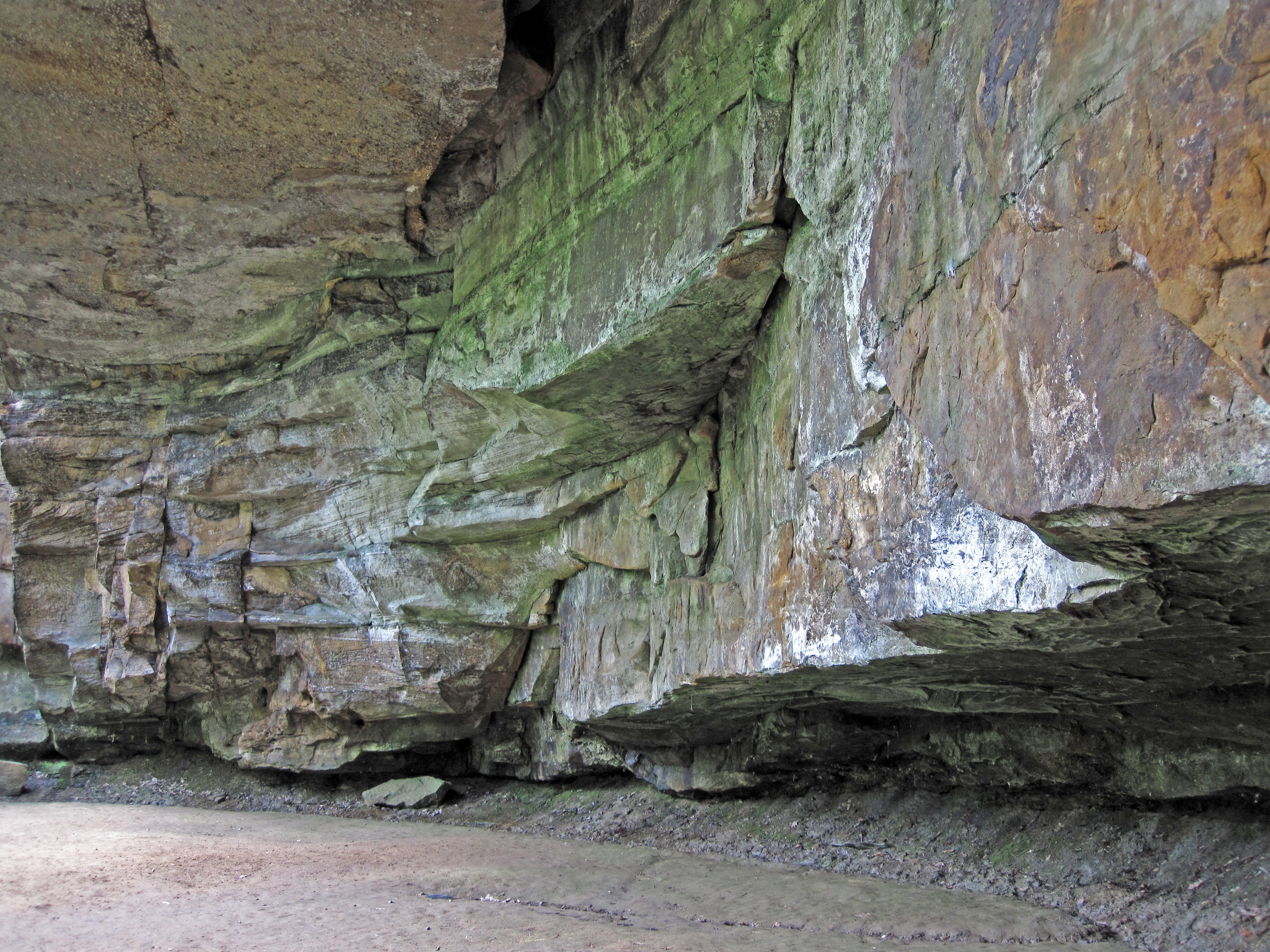
Exposure at Mary Campbell Cave
