= Betsy Zane, the Rose of Fort Henry =

2000 book by Lynda Durrant

Betsy Zane, the Rose of Fort Henry is a historical fiction book, written by award-winning author Lynda Durrant in 2000. The book is also referred to as simply Betsy Zane.

== Awards ==
Betsy Zane has received the following awards:

- Ohioana Book Award (juvenile category) OLA 2001
- Quick Picks selection by the American Library Association in 2001
- Books for the Teenage selection, New York Public Library

== Summary ==
Toward the end of the Revolutionary War, Betsy sets out alone from Philadelphia to rejoin her five brothers in western Virginia.

Thirteen-year-old Betsy Zane is bored with her privileged life in Philadelphia, bored with her great-aunt's stories about the old days, and bored with trying to be a lady. She longs to rejoin her brothers at the family homestead along the Ohio River, where she can be free to enjoy the unspoiled countryside that she has missed ever since she was forced to leave it as a child. When her great-aunt dies, Betsy has the opportunity to return to her frontier home. She frees the house slaves, bundles up the few belongings she can carry, and sets off to find safe passage to the homestead she has dreamed about. At Zane Station she finds much excitement, along with tough choices. Her new life forces her to think more deeply about slavery, loyalty, and family. Betsy begins a romance with a dashing young soldier, and takes part in the biggest adventure of her life, a run for gunpowder—an actual historical event—that saves Fort Henry in the final battle of the Revolutionary War. Based on the true story of Betsy Zane, this account is rich with historical detail.
