= The Beaded Moccasins =

The Beaded Moccasins: The Story of Mary Campbell (ISBN 9780395853986) is an American historical novel, written by Lynda Durrant in 2000. It is about a settler girl who is kidnapped by Native Americans after she turns twelve. Eventually she becomes The-Woman-Who-Saved-The-Corn.

The novel is based on the story of Mary Campbell, who was abducted by Lenape in 1758 and remained with them until 1764.

== Awards ==
The Beaded Moccasins has received the following awards:

- Notable Children's Trade Book in the Field of Social Studies selection by the National Council for the Social Studies/Children's Book Council 1998
- 1999 Ohioana Book Award (juvenile category)
- Books for the Teenage selection, New York Public Library
