= Mary Campbell Cave =

Rock shelters in Ohio, United States

Coordinates: 41°07′27″N 81°29′50″W

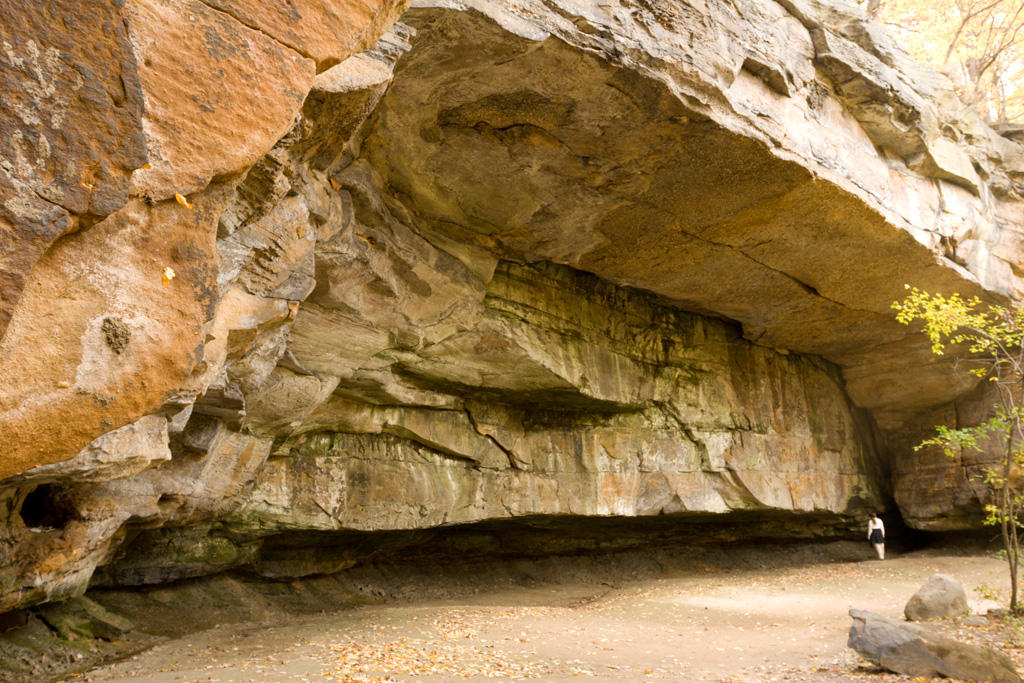
Mary Campbell Cave. Note the woman at the far end of the cave, for scale.

Mary Campbell Cave, also known as Old Maid's Kitchen, is a small secondary rock shelter in Cuyahoga Falls, Ohio. The cliff and cave roof are sandstone of the Sharon Formation, while the cave wall is shale of the Meadville formation. The cavity in the cliff was formed when water passing through the porous sandstone eroded the shale, leaving a ground-level cavity beneath the cliff. The cave is part of the Gorge Park, administered by Summit County Metroparks, and is accessible by Gorge Trail. It is located on the north wall of the gorge overlooking the Cuyahoga River. Elevation of floor is approximately 960 feet (290 m) AMSL.

The cave is notable as the temporary home of Mary Campbell. A small plaque in the center of the cave gives visitors the story of her capture by Native Americans and reads:

"In Memory of Mary Campbell

Who in 1759 at the age of twelve years was kidnapped from her home in Western Pennsylvania by Delaware Indians. In the same year these Indians were forced to migrate to this section where they erected their village at the big falls of the Cuyahoga. As a result Mary Campbell was the first white child on the Western Reserve and this tablet marks the cave where she and the Indian women temporarily lived. Later, in 1764, she was returned to her home.

Erected by the Mary Campbell Society Children of the American Revolution of Cuyahoga Falls, 1934"

The approximately 40 meter wide cavity extends from a few to around fifteen meters into the cliff, and is tall enough to accommodate standing for much of the cavity's floor area. It affords good protection from precipitation in calm conditions, but the cavity would have had to be walled to provide protection from wind.

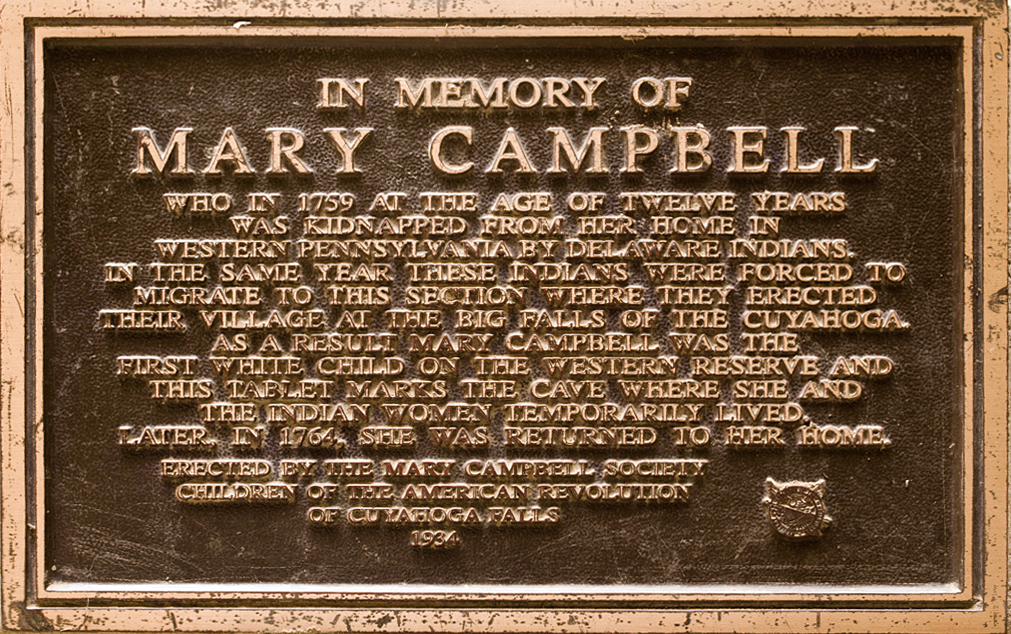
Memorial plaque located in the cave.

== Notes ==
West, Martin, Ed. Bouquet’s Expedition Against The Ohio Indians by William Smith. Kent (OH): The Kent State University Press, 2017.

West, Benjamin. Artwork. The Indians Delivering Up the English Captives to Colonel Bouquet Near His Camp at The Forks of Muskingum in North America in November 1764, 1766.
