= Jeremiah Colegrove =

American manufacturing and civic leader

- Born: July 31, 1758; Scituate, Colony of Rhode Island and Providence Plantations
- Died: August 26, 1836 (aged 78)
- Occupations: Farmer, Manufacturer
- Known for: Helped found the city of North Adams, Massachusetts

Jeremiah Colegrove (31 July 1758 – 26 August 1836) was born to William Colegrove in Scituate, Rhode Island. A man of giant stature, both physically and in the community, he was a prominent farmer and manufacturer in New England. Jeremiah served in the American Revolution and helped to found the city of North Adams, Massachusetts.

== Family ==
Jeremiah Colegrove, who became a captain during the American Revolution, was the grandson of Stephen Colegrove, Esq., an early leader in the town of Foster, Rhode Island. Jeremiah married Lydia Waterman and had at least one recorded son, Jeremiah Colegrove Jr., also of North Adams, Massachusetts, who would follow his father into the armed forces and become a General. General Jeremiah Jr. lived and died in a mansion on Main Street.

== North Adams ==
Jeremiah Colegrove moved to what became the manufacturing town of North Adams, Massachusetts, in 1780. The Daily News of Troy, New York, said of North Adams in 1890:

"The real prosperity of the Town had its birth in the introduction of the first machinery for carding wool, in 1801, when one carding-machine was put into Jeremiah Colegrove’s Grist-mill… Captain Colegrove erected a two-story mill on the east bank of the south branch, where the Phoenix mill now stands, for wool carding, cloth fulling, and cloth dressing; and he successfully carried on the business for fifteen years, despite the energetic competition of David Estes, who succeeded Roger Wing in the River Street mill..."

Captain Jeremiah Colegrove, along with others including Benjamin Sibley, formed "The Adams North Village Cotton & Woollen Manufacturing Company".

== See also ==
- Colegrove (surname)
- Stephen Colegrove
- Francis Colegrove
