= Mary Campbell (colonial settler) =

American colonist kidnapped by Native Americans as a child

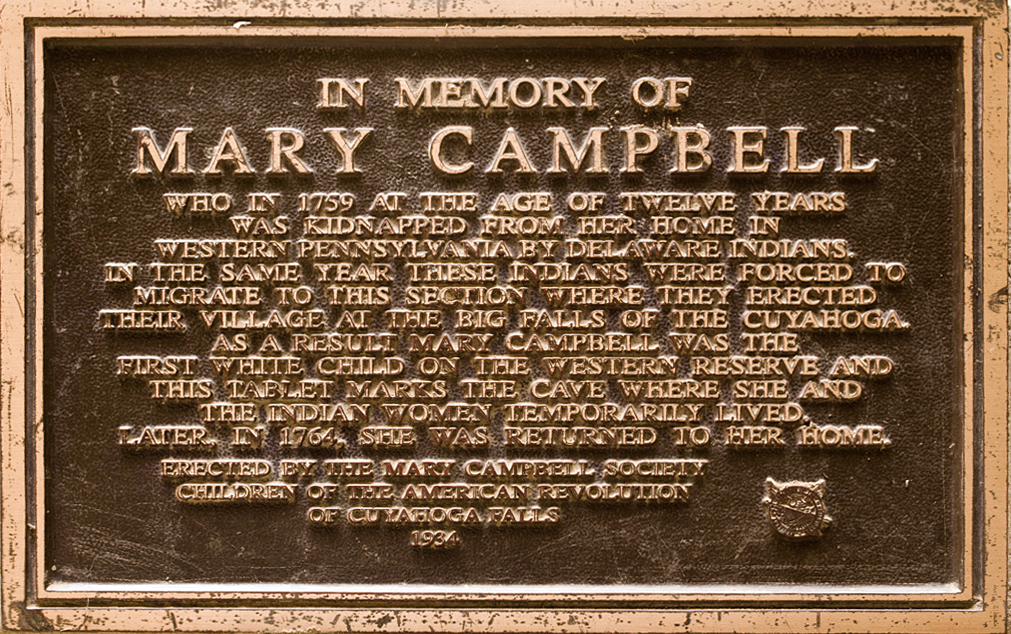
Memorial to Mary Campbell, placed just outside Mary Campbell Cave.

Mary Campbell (later Mary Campbell Willford) was an American colonial settler who was known for her abduction by Native Americans during the French and Indian War and being the first white child to travel to the Western Reserve. Born in 1747 or 1748, Campbell was taken captive by the Lenape tribe at the age of ten in 1758. It is believed that she lived with the Lenape, possibly under the care of their chief, Netawatwees, in locations near Cuyahoga Falls, Ohio, and Newcomerstown, eastern Ohio. Campbell's return to her family in Pennsylvania in 1764 was facilitated by British military pressure on the Native Americans. She was among a group of captives released to British forces and transported to Fort Pitt.

As an emblematic figure, her abduction and release shed light on the complicated dynamics and moral implications surrounding the colonization of Native American territories by Euro-American settlers.

== Early life ==
Campbell was born in 1747 or 1748. According to oral tradition among her descendants, her family identified themselves as Scotch-Irish.

== Abduction ==
On May 21, 1758, at the age of ten, Campbell was abducted from a place in or near the town of Penn's Creek, probably the town of that name situated in Cumberland (now Snyder) County, Pennsylvania. Her captors were a band of Lenape, a Native American tribe also known as the Delaware. It is widely believed that during her captivity she stayed in the household of, or with the tribe of, a principal chief of the Lenape called Netawatwees, also known by his English name, Newcomer. According to local tradition, this Native American group brought her to a cliff cavity now known as Mary Campbell Cave near the Cuyahoga River in present-day Cuyahoga Falls, Ohio. After a reportedly brief residence in the cave, she is said to have moved to a nearby Lenape village, which may have been along the southern bank of the Cuyahoga River not far from the cave, or else on the flat ground directly above the cave.

Several lines of family tradition, however, say that Campbell lived with the Lenape in a place called Newcomerstown which is further south in eastern Ohio. This tradition tends to confirm Campbell's association with Netawatwees, since Newcomerstown was named after its founder Netawatwees (Newcomer). If, as this suggests, Mary's association with the group headed by Netawatwees is accepted, then both the local tradition of Mary Campbell's stay near Cuyahoga Falls as well as the family traditions which place her in Newcomerstown are probably correct. What is historically known of Netawatwees indicates that he established his people near Cuyahoga Falls from late in 1758 or early 1759. This would correspond with a period early in Mary Campbell's captivity, since she was abducted in May 1758. It is also known that he later moved with his group to eastern Ohio and there founded Newcomerstown.

Some writers have suggested that Campbell may have been adopted by Netawatwees. The adoption into an Indian family, of captives taken in raids, was common practice among the Native Americans of that time period, and Campbell most probably was adopted into a Lenape family according to this custom. Nevertheless, although it seems certain she was a member of the tribal group which followed and moved with Netawatwees, it cannot be definitely established that she was adopted into his own household.

== Return ==
Campbell's return to her family in Pennsylvania in 1764 was a result of British military pressure on the Native Americans of southern Ohio by troops under Colonel Henry Bouquet. Over two days, August 5 and August 6, Bouquet's forces prevailed against Native American irregulars in the Battle of Bushy Run, a key battle that turned the tide of Pontiac's Rebellion. While armed conflict became rare after the battle, no formal peace had been made. Starting from Fort Niagara on August 6, 1764, Colonel John Bradstreet and 1,200 of his soldiers moved through northern Ohio on their way to Fort Detroit. Bradstreet concluded a peace treaty with a number of tribes on August 12, which would have prohibited an expedition by Bouquet to the south. General Thomas Gage rejected Bradstreet's treaty on the grounds that the Colonel had exceeded his authority in making it.

On October 1, 1764, Bouquet held meetings with Shawnee and Lenape leaders at Fort Pitt. The Indians tried to convince Bouquet that their numbers were great, and that he should not move into their territory because his army could not survive. Apparently the Indians were bluffing, because within a day or two, they had agreed to give up their white captives to Bouquet and his forces. On October 3, Bouquet and 1,500 soldiers departed Fort Pitt, arriving at a place called Tuscarawas on October 13. The next day, Bouquet met with leaders of Native American groups including those of the Lenape. The meetings lasted until October 20, when Bouquet issued an ultimatum and demanded the return of captives. Captives were turned over to Bouquet's forces at different times during and after these proceedings, Mary Campbell was among those who returned.

Campbell's name is included in a list of 60 former captives who were transferred by Captain Lewis Durry to Captain Charles Lewis for transportation to Fort Pitt. The list was made out on November 15, 1764, at a "Camp at Muskingum", presumably in present-day southeastern Ohio. Campbell would have been 16 or 17 years of age at this time, having spent about six-and-a-half years with the Lenape. The captives arrived at Fort Pitt on November 28, 1764.

Family tradition among some of Campbell's descendants indicates that she was, at least initially, unhappy at being separated from the Lenape. Although it is estimated that approximately half of the captives turned over to Bouquet attempted to return to their Native captors, a development which reportedly puzzled both the army and the communities to which the captives were being returned, it is not known whether Campbell was one of them.

In October 1764, the Pennsylvania Gazette carried an advertisement placed by Mary Campbell's family, which read in part:

...Mary Campbell, then in her 10th year, red haired, and much freckled. Her Father hearing that she is now at Albany, and being unable to go so far, begs that she may, by all good People, be helped on her way to him as he and her aged mother, are very desirous of seeing her.

This is the only known contemporary physical description of Campbell. It is not known which of several places called Albany are referred to. Sources give the date of this advertisement as October 11, 1764. If that is accurate, it is possible that Mary Campbell was in Albany, Ohio at the time; alternatively, it could refer to one of several places called Albany in Pennsylvania. The advertisement definitely implies that Mary Campbell had been turned over to Bouquet's forces before the date of its publication. A historical account of Bouquet's expedition lends credence to such a scenario by saying that Bouquet's November 15 report included persons returned from captivity up to that date. It has been claimed that one of Mary's brothers was with Bouquet's forces when she was returned. If so this would explain how Mary Campbell's father knew of her whereabouts upon placing the advertisement with the Pennsylvania Gazette.

== Personal life ==
Campbell married Joseph Willford in 1770 in Mt. Pleasant Township. Some sources place this in what was then York, but is now Adams County, Pennsylvania. The same sources have Mary and Joseph Willford continuing in York/Adams County from 1770 until they moved to Washington (now Greene) County, Pennsylvania. But tax rolls from Lack Township, situated in the Tuscarora Valley, Cumberland (now Juniata) County strongly suggest that they lived in this township from 1766 until at least 1782. A possible candidate for the place of their marriage is a town a few miles southeast of Mifflintown and adjacent to Lack Township which was later (from 1847) known as Mount Pleasant. Some time during or after 1782 they moved to Bald Ridge Farm, Dunkard Township, in present-day Greene County, Pennsylvania.

Mary and Joseph Willford had seven children: five sons, Samuel, Daniel, William, Dougal, and Joseph, and two daughters, Elizabeth and Margaret. Mary Wilford died in 1801, probably in Greene County, and was buried there.

== Cultural significance ==
Mary Campbell is widely known of in Northeast Ohio and parts of Pennsylvania, and is spoken of as an example of courage and fortitude. The story is cited as further evidence of Native American brutality and savagery.

Most long-time residents of that area know the basics of her story, which is frequently told to children, and the general facts of her experience are taught in local schools. Mary Campbell's local popularity has led to a number of books, including Song of Courage, Song of Freedom: The Story of the Child, Mary Campbell, Held Captive in Ohio by the Delaware Indians from 1759–1764 by Marilyn Seguin, and The Beaded Moccasins: The Story of Mary Campbell by Lynda Durrant. Both books are fictional.

== Family traditions ==
Although there are some biographical facts about Campbell that are solidly documented, most of the details of her life, including incidents about her capture and adoption by the Lenape tribe, have come down to the present day through oral family traditions and written records of those traditions. Although the following contain examples of conflicting information some of which must obviously be incorrect, we may safely assume that some true information is preserved in the individual family traditions. A stemmatic analysis of this, and other, traditional material, by cataloging different lines of familial descent and their accompanying traditions could possibly bring to light or clarify many incidents in Mary Campbell's life which are now unknown or not well understood by interested researchers.

- Some sources give Campbell's birth year as 1750.
- Various sources give her year of abduction as 1757 or 1759.
- According to information from Minnie Myrtle Wiley, a great great granddaughter of Campbell, she was taken by Delaware Indians (i.e. the Lenape) from or near a stockade in Penn's Creek, Cumberland County, Pennsylvania where she and others had come for safety.
- Some sources claim that Campbell was abducted in 1759 at the age of twelve years. If so, her birth would have been in 1747, and her repatriation would have occurred at around 17 years of age.
- Many modern sources report that Campbell was abducted along with a person identified as Mrs. Stuart or Stewart. A Mary Stewart is listed in the Pennsylvania Gazette list of January 17, 1765, but is not present on Captain Lewis' list.
- Some sources say Campbell was returned in 1765, even though Campbell's return in 1764 is well documented by primary sources. In May, 1765, a second group of captives were turned over to Colonel Bouquet, perhaps principally by the Shawnee. This group included an unrelated couple named "James and Mary Campbell". It is possible that these sources confuse this event for the earlier one that involved Mary Campbell. Some stories say Campbell was reunited with her family in 1765, so it could also be that the date of her reunion with her family is being confused with the date of her repatriation to British forces.
- According to Rebecca Xavier, members of the Willford family, and others, there is a strong family tradition amongst Campbell's descendants that she was very well treated by the Lenape, that she was sad to be separated from them, and that the Lenape were sad to see her go.
- Campbell is said to have been turned over to Bouquet at one of several places, depending on the source. It is plausible that Campbell could have moved through several or all of these locations in the course of leaving her Lenape home on the Cuyahoga and returning to her family in Pennsylvania. The locations indicated as the site of her return to Bouquet include:
  - the confluence of the Tuscarawas River and White Woman's River (now known as the Walhonding River) near present-day Coshocton, Ohio;
  - Chillicothe, Ohio;
  - Newcomerstown, Ohio;
  - the banks of the Muskingum River in Ohio (her presence there is supported by Captain Lewis' list);
  - Fort Carlyle, Pennsylvania.
- Some stories indicate that Campbell was reunited with her family when they attended a return of prisoners between Native Americans and settlers on July 25, 1766. These sources sometimes state that Campbell recognised a lullaby that her mother was humming, and that thereby the "little girl" (as the sixteen- to eighteen-year-old woman is invariably called in such accounts) was reunited with her family. The earliest publication of this story is probably in Akron and Summit County History by Grismer, who identifies it only as a possibility. It seems certain the story does not reference Campbell.
- The Willford History contains an account that differs from the usual in several important respects. It gives her year of abduction as 1757 (and says it happened while she was tending cows with her brother William), was held in captivity for seven years near the Muskingum River, until Bouquet's officers returned her to her parents at Fort Carlyle, Pennsylvania, in November or December 1764. This account also says that Campbell hoed corn on the Muskingum floodplain, using a hoe made from a deer scapula attached to a stick with tendon. There is also a family tradition that Mary's brother William was also abducted but died in captivity.
- According to Eleanor Womer, Dugal Campbell (Mary's brother) accompanied Colonel Bouquet to the Muskingum. He stood on a log and yelled out Mary Campbell's name, and saw that a Native woman clapped her hand over a girl's mouth in response. The girl was Mary Campbell, and that is how she was recovered. While this is uncertain, it is known that relatives of a number of known captives traveled with Bouquet in October 1764.
- In addition to brothers Dougal and William, Mary Campbell also had a brother Daniel. Daniel and William are said to have served in the Revolution; Daniel in the same outfit with Campbell's husband, Joseph Willford. The William who served in the revolution is known from his pension record, and is documented to have been born in 1761, so cannot be the same William described in the Willford History.

== Notes ==
- The originals of the Bouquet Papers are held in the British Museum; copies are available in the Canadian Archives in Ottawa, and the US Library of Congress. The papers record Colonel Bouquet's actions in the area of Western Pennsylvania and Ohio, and is the source for Captain Lewis' list. The same list is reproduced in a See family history. This source also establishes the association between Netawatwees and Mary Campbell.
- Pennsylvania Gazette, LIST of CAPTIVES taken by the INDIANS, and delivered to Colonel BOUQUET, by the Mingoes, Delawares, Shawanese, Wyondots and Mohickons, at Tuscarawas and Muskingam, in November, 1764, published on January 17, 1765. Part of this notice is reproduced in some documentation for the Fincher family history. Note that the Report to the Cuyahoga Falls Chapter, D.A.R., mentions the same notice as appearing in the Maryland Gazette of the same date.
- Report to the Cuyahoga Falls Chapter, D.A.R., June 1934, by Mrs. J. B. McPherson entitled "Mary Campbell – The First White Child on the Western Reserve". This report is also available at the Mary Campbell site.
- Pennsylvania Gazette, advertisement by Mary Campbell's family, published October 11, 1764. This is the source adopted here for Campbell's year of birth and date of abduction. The advertisement is included in a digital image of a photocopied sheet which shows part of a newspaper page. The photocopy from which the image was taken is of poor, but readable, quality. The name of the newspaper and the date have been penciled in at the bottom the photocopy. The October 11, 1764 date is apparently correct since, just above the advertisement, on the same page, is a report on the "last accounts from Pittsburgh" which relate that Colonel Bouquet with forces of his army had crossed the Ohio and awaited volunteers from Virginia to complete their numbers. This would agree with incidents which took place at the end of September and the beginning of October 1764.
- The Mary Cambell Memorial is a plaque laid by the Mary Campbell Society, Children of the American Revolution of Cuyahoga Falls, in 1934, outside Mary Campbell Cave.
- William Willford. Genealogy and History of the Willford Family in America. Canton Minnesota: 1916. This history contains recollections of William's grandmother Mary Ann Willford, née Eniex or Enochs. She was the wife of Joseph Wilford Jr. who was one of Campbell's sons. This work is one source of the 1750 birth date for Campbell.
- Information from the tax rolls of Lack Township, Cumberland (now Juniata) County, Pennsylvania document the presence of Joseph Willford, a William Campbell, a William Campbell Jr., a Daniel Campbell, and a Dougal Campbell. Some family traditions among descendants of Mary Campbell identify Mary's father's name as William and her two brothers as Daniel and William. Others also, or in place of Daniel or William Jr., identify Dougal Campbell as a brother of Mary Campbell. Joseph and Mary Willford named one of their sons as Dougal Campbell Willford (born 1777).

Dougal Campbell also appears in Washington (now Greene) County, Pennsylvania in association with the Willfords during the period between 1788 and the end of the 18th century. That Lack Township coincides with the Tuscarora Valley is also significant since William Willford's Genealogy and History of the Willford Family in America as well as at least one other source identifies the Tuscarora Valley as the area where Joseph Willford settled in Cumberland County.

== Other sources ==
- An Otterbein bibliography
- Peter Peterson Cherry, The Portage Path, Western Reserve Co, 1911. ASIN B00085IORI
- The Legend of Mary Campbell, in the December 1985 edition of Our Town Akron, pages 2 through 4.
- John E Hopley, History of Crawford County and Representative Citizens, Whipporwill Publications, 1983. ASIN B0006YBZZ4. See the biography of Lorenzo Dow Willford on pages 1229 to 1233.
- Allan W. Eckert, The Conquerors, Bantam Books, 1981, p. 768.
- (unknown author and date), Green Islands, Akron Metropolitan Park District. This is a brochure, which contains an article "Why Mary Campbell Cave?"
- A book called "History of the Delaware Indians." This might refer to Richard C. Adams, A Brief History of the Delaware Indians, US Congress and Senate, 59th Congress, 1st Session, Senate Document Number 501, Serial Number 4916, Washington, DC: Government Printing Office, 1906.
- John Gottlieb Ernestus Heckewelder and Paul A. W. Wallace, Thirty Thousand Miles with John Heckewelder, Wennawoods Pub (2000), ISBN 1-889037-13-3
- Mary Campbell site.
