= Georges Antoine Chabot =

French jurist and statesman

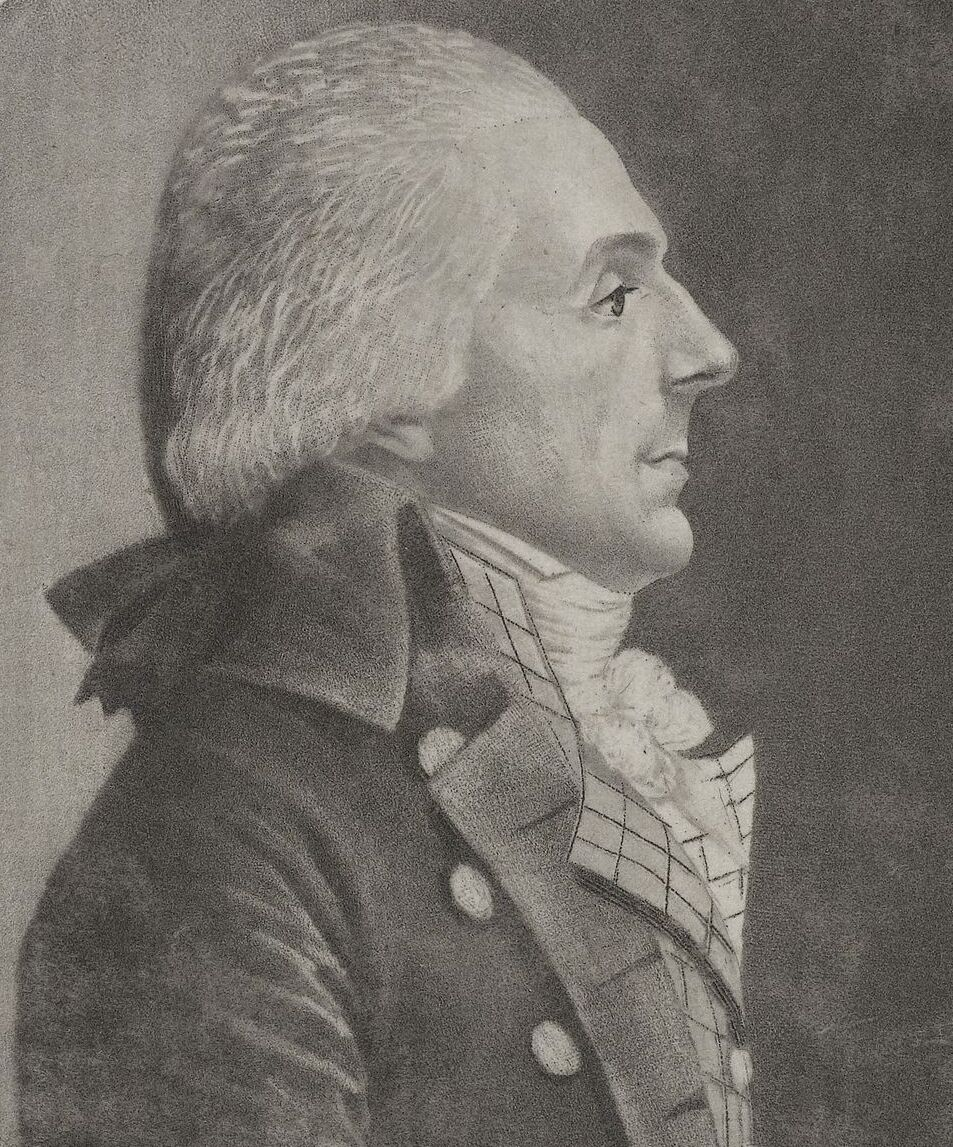
Image of Georges-Antoine Chabot de l'Allier

Georges Antoine Chabot (English: /ʃæˈboʊ/ sha-BOH, French: [ʒɔʁʒ ɑ̃twan ʃabo]; 13 April 1758, Montluçon – 18 April 1819, Paris), known as Chabot de Lallier, was a French jurist and statesman.

== Biography ==
Chabot was president of the tribunal in Montluçon, he was elected as a deputy supplant to the National Convention during the French Revolution.

A member of the French Directory's Council of the Ancients, then of the Consulate's Tribunate, he was president of the latter when the Treaty of Amiens recognizing the French Republic was signed. He had a resolution adopted which tended to give Napoleon Bonaparte the consulship for life, and in 1804 supported the proposal to establish a hereditary monarchy (the First French Empire).

Napoleon named him inspector-general of the law schools, then judge of the court of cassation.

He published various legal works, e.g. Tableau de la législation ancienne sur les successions et de la législation nouvelle établie par le code civil (Paris, 1804), and Questions transitoires sur le Code Napoléon (Paris, 1809).
