= Amalia Holst =

German writer (1758-1829)

- Born: Amalia von Justi; 1758; Mecklenburg, Germany
- Died: 6 January 1829 (aged 70–71); Groß-Timkenberg, Germany
- Occupations: Writer, teacher
- Spouse: Ludolf Holst
- Writing career
- Language: German
- Period: 1791-1802
- Notable works: Über die Bestimmung des Weibes zur höhern Geistesbildung (On the Purpose of Women's Advanced Intellectual Development), Bemerkungen über die Fehler unserer modernen Erziehung von einer praktischen Erzieherin (Observations on the Errors of Our Modern Education by a Practical Teacher)

Amalia Holst (née Amalia von Justi; 10 February 1758 – 6 January 1829) was a German writer, intellectual, and early feminist. Her work examined traditional pedagogy and challenged Enlightenment writers such as Jean-Jacques Rousseau. She often is called the German counterpart to Mary Wollstonecraft. Little is known about Amalia Holst's life. She rose to prominence in the late 1700s through her works as a teacher. She became more widely recognized in the 1970s, after her work was rediscovered and republished by Kassel University Press.

== Life ==
=== Early life ===
Amalia Holst was born in 1758 in Mecklenburg. She is the daughter of Johanna Maria Magdalena Marchand and Johann Heinrich Gottlob von Justi and the oldest of six children from her father's second marriage. Her father was a well-known political economist and the Prussian chief inspector of mines. He was an advocate of women's rights who published pieces advocating for improved education for women. When Holst was ten years old, her father was accused of embezzling funds and imprisoned in Küstrin, where he died several years later.

After her father's death, the family was split up. Their possessions had to be dissolved. Holst's mother went to live with her brother, who was a pastor in Brunswick. Holst's younger sisters were lodged into a monastery in Potsdam and her brother was admitted into a Danish cadet school. What happened to Holst during this time is unknown, but she is reported to have been employed as a teacher at a young age. She is said to have received a doctorate in philosophy from the University of Kiel. In large part due to the influence of von Justi's progressive beliefs, Holst was one of very few women to receive a college education during this time in Germany.

=== Marriage and children ===
At the age of thirty-three, in 1791 she married Ludolf Holst. He was a lawyer as well as the director of the Pedagogical Institute in Hamburg-St Georg. They had three children together, one son and two daughters.

=== Career ===
In 1791, Holst published her first work, Observations on the Errors of our Modern Education by a Practical Teacher (German: Bemerkungen über die Fehler unserer Modernen Erziehung von einer Praktischen Erzieherin), after having supported herself through teaching from a young age.

From about 1792–1802, Holst was the headmistress of the preschool that her husband oversaw. During this time, she opened several small schools in Hamburg, Wittenberg, and Boizenburg as well. These schools were short-lived, however. The reason for their closings is not known.

In 1799, Holst published "Letters on Elisa, or Women as they Ought to be" (German: “Briefe über Elisa, oder das Weib wie es seyn sollte"), the second of her three known works. It was written in response to the novel, Elisa, which according to Holst, dangerously extolled the marital oppression of the title character. In her response she also strongly advocated for marital equality and female autonomy. She argued that women should be defined as human beings first and as wives second. This was the beginning of her involvement in a larger debate about feminism occurring during this time.

In 1802, Holst published a third work: On the Purpose of Women’s Advanced Intellectual Development (German: Über die Bestimmung des Weibes zur höhern Geistesbildung).

=== Death ===
Holst died in Groß-Timkenberg on 6 January 1829.

=== Modern recognition ===
Holst is memorialized in Judy Chicago's installation art piece The Dinner Party, which features a triangular table with 39 place settings, each commemorating important women in history. While Holst is not given a place setting, her name, along with the names of 998 other feminist icons, is inscribed in gold on the white tile floor below the table.

== Published works ==
=== Observations on the Errors of Our Modern Education by a Practical Teacher ===
Published in 1791, Observations on the Errors of Our Modern Education by a Practical Teacher criticizes widely accepted conservative pedagogical theories, specifically those of Campe and Basedow. Holst analyzes their ideas from the perspective of an educator, and points out the flaws and contradictions within them. She also calls attention to the impractical nature of their ideas.

=== Letters on Elisa ===
In 1799, Holst responded to the success of the novel Elisa with letters that were included in its fifth edition. She wrote four letters, addressed to the title character criticizing the self-sacrificing and submissive role of women. This seems to be Holst's first public statement for gender equality. According to Holst, a woman's attachment to her spouse did not detract from her autonomy. She emphasized a woman's responsibility to her domestic duty, however, and referred to her own marriage as "a domestic bliss".

=== On the Purpose of Women’s Advanced Intellectual Development ===
Holst makes the case for the same higher education for men and women alike in On the Purpose of Women’s Advanced Intellectual Development. This notion was very radical: unlike many of the prominent advocates for the education of women before her, such as La Roche, Herder, and Goethe.

Holst rejected the idea of separate curricula for the genders, believing that women could and should learn the same things men do. This was not an accepted idea at the time. Her ideas diverged from most her contemporary equal-education advocates as well, including the likes of Hippel, Wollstonecraft, and Condorcet. While they were in favor of an advanced public coeducation system, Holst insisted on a professional maternal educator who would instruct her children in all academic disciplines from early childhood through adolescence. Asserting that only women who were thoroughly educated themselves were fit to educate the next generation, and thus, Holst reasoned that every woman was to be educated. She advocated for an in-depth knowledge of history, the sciences, philosophy, geography, and the arts. Holst stressed that the most important quality of an effective maternal educator was the ability to draw meaningful connections among all disciplines. She also placed an emphasis on individual perfection, urging women to engage continually in intellectual pursuits throughout the course of their lives.

Holst made several demands for the education of women:

- Women were to have complete freedom to study every subject.
- Women were to be given access to original sources, as opposed to those specifically written for women, which she claimed offered “superficial knowledge” and which “treat [women] like overgrown children”.
- Exceptionally intelligent women were to have access to a formal university education. They were to be free of the pressure to have children. She used the philosophers Kant and Leibniz as examples, noting that both were celibate, but their “immortal works, the offspring of their minds, have enriched the world”. Why then, Holst argued, shouldn't the same apply to women?
- She demanded acceptance that women were capable of achievements in the most advanced fields of thought. Holst asserts “there exists no proof that a woman’s mind cannot comprehend the higher sciences”.
