= Vincenzo Dandolo =

Italian scientist (1758–1819)

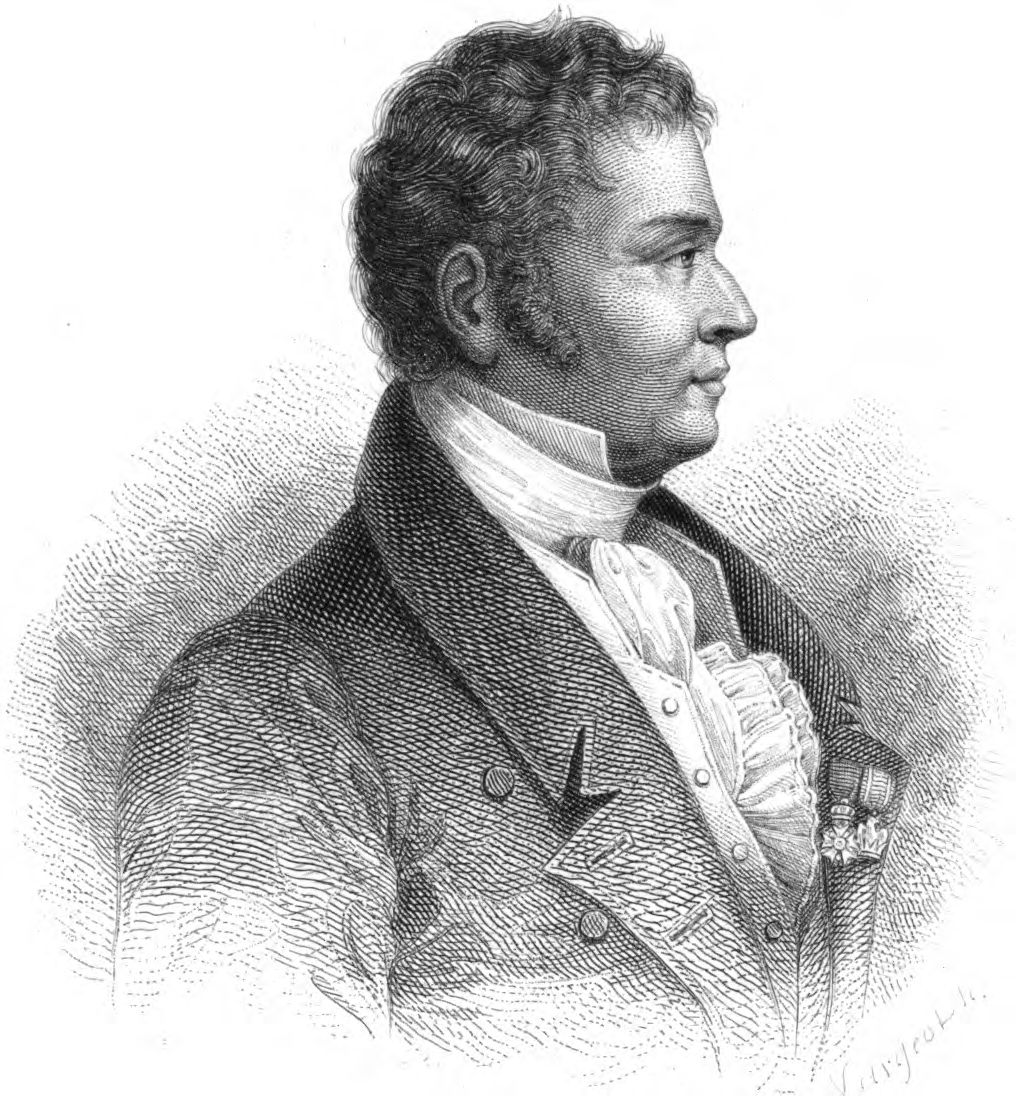
- Vincenzo Dandolo
- Born: 22 or 26 October 1758; Venice
- Died: 12 December 1819 (aged 61)
- Scientific career
- Fields: Agriculture, chemistry

Count Vincenzo Dandolo (1758–1819) was an Italian chemist and agriculturist. He was born in Venice of good family, though not of the same house as the famous doges, and began his career as a physician.

He was a prominent opponent of the oligarchical party in the revolution which took place on the approach of Napoleon and ended the Republic of Venice; and he was one of the envoys sent to seek the protection of the French. When the request was refused, and Venice was placed under Austria in the Treaty of Campo Formio, he removed to Milan, where he was made member of the great council. In 1799, on the invasion of the Russians and the overthrow of the Cisalpine republic, Dandolo retired to Paris, where, in the same year, he published his treatise Les Hommes nouveaux, d'opérer une régénération nouvelle. But he soon after returned to the neighborhood of Milan to devote himself to scientific agriculture.

In 1805 Napoleon made him governor of Dalmatia, with the title of provéditeur général, in which position Dandolo distinguished himself by his efforts to remove the wretchedness and idleness of the people, and to improve the country by draining the pestilential marshes and introducing better methods of agriculture. When, in 1809, Dalmatia was re-annexed to the Illyrian provinces, Dandolo returned to Venice, having received as his reward from the French emperor the title of count and several other distinctions. He died in Varese on 13 December 1819.

Dandolo published in Italian several treatises on agriculture, vine-cultivation, and the rearing of cattle and sheep; a work on silkworms, which was translated into French by Fontanelle; a work on the discoveries in chemistry which were made in the last quarter of the 18th century (published 1796); and translations of several of the best French works on chemistry.
