= Joseph-François-Louis-Charles de Damas =

Duke Joseph François Louis Charles de Damas (28 October 1758 – 5 March 1829 in Paris) was a French general.

As a colonel, he was aide-de-camp to the commander in chief of the French Expeditionary Force in the American Revolution from 1780 to 1781. After his return, he was given the command over a dragoon regiment.

In June 1791, he was entrusted to cover the escape of King Louis XVI, but left his regiment and joined the king in Varennes, where he was arrested. Sentenced to death in Paris, he was pardoned and followed the Comte d'Artois to Italy, was named maréchal de camp in 1795 and was en route to join the Quiberon expedition, when he was shipwrecked in Calais and was captured by the Republicans.

Under the Consulate, he was again pardoned, accompanied Artois as general adjudant to Ile-Dieu, served from 1797 to 1801 in the Prince de Condé's émigré army. After the Bourbon Restoration, he was made a Peer of France and the general lieutenant and captain of the Chevaulegers. He followed Louis XVIII in 1815 to Belgium, became captain of the 18th division at Dijon, and received a dukedom in 1825.

In the Mémoires relatifs à la révolution (20th Vol., Par. 1823), he wrote a report on the events at Varennes.
