= Echohawk =

Echohawk is a young adult historical novel written by author Lynda Durrant, first published in 1998. Set in the early eighteenth century, it is about a white boy adopted by the Mohicans.

== Plot summary ==
Echohawk was a little boy when he was taken from his white family and adopted into a Mohican tribe. For years Echohawk has been speaking and thinking in the Mohican language. He enjoys hunting with his adoptive father Glickihigan and younger brother Bamaineo. Yet as time passes, Glickihigan thinks an English education will help his sons in the changing world and sends them to be schooled by white people. It's then that Echohawk's earliest memories return. Soon the time will come for him to choose between the world of the Mohicans and the world he came from long ago.

== Sequel ==
A sequel, Turtle Clan Journey, was published in 1999.

== Awards ==
Echohawk has received the following awards:

- Young Adult Choice Award
- International Reading Association Award
- Books for the Teen Age selection, New York Public Library
