= Colegrove (surname) =

Colegrove is a surname that developed in England between the 12th and 15th centuries. The name may have originated from a grove along the River Cole, Wiltshire, a tributary of the River Thames in England. Another explanation as to the origin of the name is from the Middle English cole ‘coal’ + grave ‘pit’, ‘grave’ (Old English col + græf). Other forms of spelling in the past include ‘Colgrove’, ‘Colegrave’, ‘Colgrave’, ‘Coulgrove’. The first records of the Colegrove name were in 14th century England.

The family name is found throughout the United Kingdom, the United States, Canada, Australia, New Zealand, South Africa, Ireland and other nations. The first known mention of Colgrove as a surname was of one Johannes Colgrove of Kiddington, Oxfordshire from 1377 during the Poll Tax levied to finance the war against France by John of Gaunt. In 1828, a John Colegrove was an overseer in Tadmarton, Oxfordshire.

There were also place names in England with the name Colegrove. The earliest mention of which was in a grant of land from one "William de Colethrop" to his son John in Kemerton, Gloucestershire recorded in 1260. Another place named Colegrave was listed in Northamptonshire records in 1293 in The National Archives of the UK, and later in 1545 in Essex.

The earliest known Colegrove who settled in America was Francis Colegrove who came from England to Rhode Island colony about the year 1683, and from whom descend much of the family in the United States today.

== List of persons with the surname ==
- Francis Colegrove (c. 1667 – c. 1759), colonial immigrant first known Colegrove in the United States
- Jeremiah Colegrove (1756–1838) one of the founders of North Adams, Massachusetts

== See also ==
- Colegrove v. Green, United States Supreme Court case
- Colegrove, Pennsylvania, town founded in the 19th century as a rail depot in McKean County, named after Colegrove founders
