= Francis Colegrove =

English colonial immigrant (c. 1667–c. 1759)

Francis Colegrove Sr. (c. 1667 – c. 1759) was an English colonial immigrant, born most likely in Oxfordshire or London, England, although others have suggested Glamorgan, Wales, who settled in Warwick, Rhode Island, in about 1688. He is the first known Colegrove in America. His immigration is important in the fact that most people that bear the surname Colegrove in the United States can be traced back to him.

== In Colonial Rhode Island ==
The earliest records of people with the name Colegrove in Britain can be traced to the 16th century and were found in the Oxfordshire area of England. The surname is thought to have originated from a grove along the little River Cole, in Wiltshire, Oxfordshire, a tributary to the River Thames, or the River Cole, West Midlands, a tributary of the River Tame, near Coleshill/Birmingham.

Records can be scantly put together that seem to imply that Francis Colegrove Sr. came to America from England between 1680 and 1688. He had a daughter named Elizabeth around 1688. Francis married a woman named Ann in Rhode Island. A likely reason Francis moved to Rhode Island from Britain, was that many separatists and Baptists from the Swansea area of Wales were moving to the American colonies for religious and political freedom.

Francis, who was a farmer, and his wife joined the Newport Sabbatarian Baptist Church of Newport, Rhode Island, which was the first Seventh Day Baptist group in North America in August 1698, being baptized as adults. Stephen Mumford came to the colonies in 1665, and formed the Newport Church, where Francis and Ann attended, in 1671. During the 17th century, many Baptists, as well as many non-conformists and separatists, found refuge from persecution in Britain and other colonies such as Massachusetts, in the colony of Rhode Island, which had been set up by Baptists Roger Williams and Anne Hutchinson in the 1630s and 1640s.

== Family ==
Francis and Ann Colegrove had at least five children, in addition to Elizabeth: their eldest, Jeremiah Colegrove, followed by Eli Colegrove (in 1689), Stephen Colegrove (1694), Francis Colegrove, Jr. (about 1697), and John Colegrove (1714). Jeremiah, their first son, died in 1710 at Port Royal, Nova Scotia during Queen Anne's War.

== Later life ==
Francis was a farmer in the new world. There is record of his owning land in the "Narragansett Country", which was an area of Rhode Island named after the Narragansett (tribe) of Native Americans. He was given the land to recompense the loss of his son, who helped him with farming. Here is an excerpt on Francis, known by some today as "The Patriarch", from William Colegrove's Book (mentioned below):

"He was evidently an active, enterprising, pioneer farmer, who attended to his own business and kept out of politics, --- thus setting an excellent example --- which has been followed by his descendants. The death of his oldest son seems to have been a severe blow to him in respect to his business, compelling him to ask a little relief from the Legislature of the Colony, --- which relief, it is pleasant to know, was readily granted. The following is from The R.I. Colonial Records, V. 4, p. 136; "Proceedings of R.I. and Prov. Plantations at Newport, 27 February 1711-12.""

A prominent land holder, Francis Colegrove owned land in other places. On June 28, 1709 a committee that had been formed by the Rhode Island general assembly, sold a large tract of land known as the 'Shannock Purchase' located near Richmond, Rhode Island. Francis was among the recipients of the land.

Ann and Francis ended up in Westerly, Rhode Island by 1712, as there are records of Anne being involved in the Sabbatarian congregation there. Ann Colegrove died sometime after 1718, before Francis. No one knows for sure when Francis Colegrove died, but William Colegrove, author of the 1894 publication, The History and Genealogy of the COLEGROVE FAMILY in America, believed he may have died around 1759 or before in Hopkinton, Rhode Island. Previously, more conservative researchers suggested that he may have died sometime between 1725 and 1729. More recent research shows Francis Colegrove, Sr. still alive in 1728, when he was summoned to appear at a Church meeting in regard to a dispute between his son Francis, Jr. and a William James over payment of an ox that Francis Jr had given Mr. James. The committee found in favor of Francis Jr. In the Seventh-Day Baptist Memorial of 1874, which mentions the dispute, Francis Colegrove is listed still living and attending the Westerly congregation, with a second Francis Colegrove, probably Jr., in 1740 in "a list of members made up by a Committee of the church in 1740".

== See also ==
- Colegrove (surname)
- Colegrove v. Green
- Captain Jeremiah Colegrove

== Sources ==
1. "History of Richmond, Rhode Island"
2. "Kent County, Rhode Island Forum"
3. "Members of the Sabbatarian Church"
4. "Seventh Day Baptist Memorial" pages 69-70, 114-115
