= Brummett T. Echohawk =

Artist (1922–2006)

Brummett T. Echohawk (1922–2006) was an artist known for his wartime illustrations, historical pictures, and impressionist landscapes, as well as an actor, speaker, humorist, and writer. He was born on March 3, 1922, in Pawnee, Oklahoma, and died at age 83 in Bartlesville, Oklahoma, on February 13, 2006. Echohawk was a member of the Pawnee Indian tribe.

During World War II, Echohawk served with Oklahoma's 45th Infantry Division, known as the Thunderbirds, in Company B, 179th Infantry. He saw active duty in North Africa, Sicily, and Italy, demonstrating bravery in combat for which he received three Bronze Star Medals, three Purple Hearts, and a Congressional Gold Medal. Echohawk's wartime art depicting combat was published in the Army's Yank Magazine and distributed to 88 newspapers across the nation.

Echohawk was deeply influenced by his Pawnee roots. However, he resisted the label of "Indian artist." Echohawk's paintings and illustrations explore themes of identity, cultural heritage, and the regional landscape.

== Biography ==
Brummett T. Echohawk was born in Pawnee, Oklahoma, on March 3, 1922, and spent his childhood at the Ponca Indian Boarding School in Ponca, Oklahoma. After his mother's death in 1929, he was adopted by his uncle George Echo Hawk and his wife Lucille Shunatona. He attended high school in New Mexico and Oklahoma, joining the National Guard in 1939.

During his military service with the 45th Infantry, Echohawk met then Lieutenant Colonel Dwight D. Eisenhower. He was cited by the press as a model example of Indian soldiers. While in Sicily, he began sketching soldiers, both allies and enemies. His unpublished first-person narrative of the war is one of the few accounts of American Indian experiences during the war, told by an American Indian. His realistic sketches of the war were exhibited at the Imperial War Museum in London, in West Germany, and in newspapers in the U.S.

After returning from Europe, Echohawk studied art at the Detroit School of Art and Craft in 1945 and attended the Art Institute of Chicago from 1945 to 1948. He worked as a staff artist at Chicago newspapers and as an announcer for WBKB in Chicago, before moving to New York, where he continued to find jobs in television and as a cartoonist and designer for advertising and illustrations. In 1952 he moved to Tulsa, Oklahoma. His cartoon "Little Chief," appeared in the Tulsa World in 1954. He was commissioned to paint a portrait of Oklahoma Senator James R. Jones in 1987. He served as a board member of the Gilcrease Museum from 1977 to 1982. His wife, Mary Frances McInnes, died in 1986.

== Themes and artwork ==
Brummett Echohawk's art style can be characterized as Impressionistic, as in An Island of Redbuds on the Cimarron (1968). He employed a variety of textures and techniques, including thickly applied paint and a Bowie knife for specific effects. He described his aims as: "A painting should be an investment. It should move you and move you and move you. That is why I do Impressionistic landscapes. I am painting the spirit of a picture, not a picture of a picture." He avoided exhibiting in traditional Indian art expositions, though much of his work depicted American Indians and the West. He saw himself as a realist painter, with classical training, who was also Pawnee.

Trail of Tears (1957) depicts the forced removal of the Pawnee Nation from ancestral homelands (in the region of present-day Nebraska) to Indian Territory (present-day Oklahoma). He researched his history paintings in order to accurately portray the past and avoid stereotypes. He did extensive research on the Battle of Little Big Horn and the Amon Carter Museum included two of his paintings in a 1968 Custer exhibition.

He illustrated western historian and novelist Mari Sandoz's article on Sitting Bull, and the two corresponded. He also illustrated for others' books and articles on the West throughout his career. He assisted Thomas Hart Benton with the mural for the Truman Presidential Library in Missouri. He designed the Pawnee Nation Flag in 1977.

== Exhibitions ==
Echohawk's paintings were exhibited in the United States Information Agency's overseas art program in Pakistan and India.

His 39 drawings, displayed at the National Cowboy and Western Heritage Museum, offer his perspective on the wartime experience.
