= Lynda Durrant =

American writer

Lynda Durrant (born December 17, 1954) is an American author of children's books. These include The Beaded Moccasins: The Story of Mary Campbell (1998), Turtle Clan Journey (1999), Echohawk (1996), Betsy Zane, the Rose of Fort Henry (2000), and The Sun, the Rain, and the Apple Seed: A Novel of Johnny Appleseed's Life (2003), My Last Skirt (2006) and Imperfections (2008).

== Personal life ==
Durrant was born and raised in Ohio by her parents Oliver and Shirley. At the age of 22, she received a Bachelor's Degree from the University of Washington, and in 1979 she received her Master's. She later married Mike Bilow, and has one child. She currently resides in Murrells Inlet, South Carolina, and teaches writing classes and continues to write.

== Awards ==
Lynda Durrant has received the following awards:

- For Echohawk:
  - Young Adult Choice Award
  - International Reading Association Award
  - Books for the Teenage selection, New York Public Library
- For The Beaded Moccasins: The Story of Mary Campbell:
  - Notable Children's Trade Book in the Field of Social Studies selection by the National Council for the Social Studies/Children's Book Council 1998
  - 1999 Ohioana Book Award (juvenile category)
  - Books for the Teenage selection, New York Public Library
- For Betsy Zane, the rose of Fort Henry:
  - Ohioana Book Award (juvenile category) OLA 2001
  - Quick Picks selection by the American Library Association in 2001
  - Books for the Teenage selection, New York Public Library

Starred review in Booklist For "My Last Skirt" starred review in Kirkus, a Parents' Choice Award, and a Bloomer Award. For "The Sun, the Rain, and the Appleseed" an Aesop award. For "Imperfections" ALA Notable For "Ariel Bradley, Spy for General Washington" 2013, Eric Hoffer Book Award. Lynda Durrant has two optioned screenplays from her novels, 'The Beaded Moccasins, the Story of Mary Campbell' and a screenplay for the adult audience, 'It Pours'which is based upon the novel, 'It Pours' written with Waldron Caldwell.
