= Hughes (surname) =

Origin
- Languages: Welsh, Irish Gaelic, French, Scottish Gaelic
- Meaning: patronymic name for "son of Hugh" or "fire"
- Region of origin: Wales, Ireland, France, Scotland

Other names
- Variant forms: Ó hAodha, McHugh, MacHugh, O'Hugh, Ap Huw, Ap Hugh, Huson, Hughs, Huws, Hews, Hayes, Haynes, Haines, Pugh, Hugues, Hughues, Hugeus, Howe
- Related names: Hewitt, Hutchinson

Hughes is an English language surname, usually of Irish and Welsh origin.

== Origins ==
Hughes is an Anglicized spelling of the Welsh and Irish patronymic surname. The surname may also derive from the etymologically unrelated Picard variant Hugh (Old French Hue) of the Germanic name Hugo.

In Wales and other areas of Brythonic Britain, the surname derives from the personal name "Hu" or "Huw", meaning "fire" or "inspiration". At the British Census of 1881, the relative frequency of the surname Hughes was highest on the Welsh island of Ynys Môn (Anglesey; 37.2 times the British average), followed by Gwynedd, Flintshire, Denbighshire, Meirionydd, Montgomeryshire, Ceredigion, Radnorshire and Carmarthenshire.

In Ireland, the surname evolved from the ancient Irish name of Ó hAodha, for a grandson/descendant of Aodh (meaning "fire"), they separated from the descendants of the Leochán (the origin of the last name of Lohan). Aodh was frequently Anglicized as Hugh, with Ó hAodha, in turn, being Anglicized as Hughes or Hayes. "Hughes" is often found in the province of Ulster, being especially common in counties Armagh, Tyrone, Monaghan, Donegal and Fermanagh. It was the 34th most common name in all of Ireland in Matheson's 1890 census of Ireland, and the 44th most common surname in Ireland in the 1992–1997 period. Outside of Ulster, the surname Hughes is also commonly found in counties Wexford, Galway and Cork.

People with the surname include:

== A ==
- Aarika Hughes (born 1987), American basketball coach
- Aaron Hughes (born 1979), Northern Irish footballer
- Abel Hughes (1869–??), Welsh footballer
- Adam Hughes (disambiguation)
- Amy Hughes (disambiguation)
- Andrew Hughes (disambiguation)
- Ann Hughes (disambiguation)
- Anthony Hughes (disambiguation)
- Archie Hughes (disambiguation)
- Arthur Hughes (disambiguation)
- Adella Prentiss Hughes (1869–1950), American pianist
- Agnes Twiston Hughes (1895–1981), Welsh politician
- Aidan Hughes (born 1956), British commercial artist
- Akilah Hughes (born 1989), American comedian
- Alan Hughes (disambiguation)
- Albert Hughes (disambiguation)
- Aleca Hughes (born 1990), American ice hockey player
- Alexander Hughes (disambiguation)
- Alfred Hughes (disambiguation)
- Alfredrick Hughes (1962–2026), American basketball player
- Alice Hughes (1857–1939), English photographer
- Alice Hughes (journalist) (1898–1977), American journalist
- Alice Catherine Hughes, Hong Kong-based educator
- Ailsa Hughes (born 1991), Irish rugby union footballer
- Alison Hughes (born 1971/1972), British tennis umpire
- Alister Hughes (1919–2005), Grenadian journalist
- Allen Hughes (critic) (1921–2009), American music critic
- Amber Hughes (born 1994), American triple jumper and hurdler
- Andy Hughes (1965–2009), British music producer
- Aneurin Hughes (1937–2020), British diplomat
- Angee Hughes (born 1955), American actress
- Arwel Hughes (1909–1988), Welsh composer and conductor
- Augusto Hughes (1931–1993), Argentine soldier

== B ==
- Babette Hughes (1905–1982), American playwright
- Barnard Hughes (1915–2006), Irish-American actor
- Barry Hughes (1937–2019), Welsh football player and manager
- Barry B. Hughes (born 1945), American professor
- Bela M. Hughes (1817–1903), American politician
- Ben D. Hughes (1878–1947), American farmer and politician
- Benji Hughes (born 1975), American musical artist
- Bernard Hughes (1808–1878), Irish industrialist and politician
- Bernie Hughes (1910–1967), American football player
- Beryl Hughes (1931–2017), Welsh chess master and writer
- Bethany Hughes (1985–2002), Canadian cancer patient
- Bettany Hughes (born 1968), English historian
- Beverley Hughes (born 1950), British politician
- Bill Hughes (disambiguation)
- Billie Hughes (1948–1998), American singer, songwriter and record producer
- Billy Hughes (disambiguation)
- Bradley Hughes (disambiguation)
- Brandon Hughes (disambiguation)
- Brendan Hughes (1948–2008), Irish army officer
- Brent Hughes (disambiguation)
- Brewster Hughes (1912–1986), Nigerian guitarist
- Brian Hughes (disambiguation)
- Brigid Hughes, American editor
- Bronwen Hughes (born 1967), Canadian film director

== C ==
- Cadwalader Hughes, 16th-17th century English priest
- Calista Cooper Hughes (1914–2004), American politician
- Calvin Hughes, American news anchor
- Cameron Hughes (disambiguation)
- Caoilinn Hughes (born 1985), Irish novelist
- Carl Hughes, British rugby league footballer
- Carla Hughes (born 1981), American teacher and murderer
- Carly Hughes, American actress
- Carlye J. Hughes, American bishop
- Carol Hughes (disambiguation)
- Caspar Hughes (born 1993), English footballer
- Catherine Hughes (disambiguation)
- Cathy Hughes (born 1947), American entrepreneur
- Ceri Hughes (born 1971), Welsh footballer
- Charles Hughes (disambiguation)
- Charleston Hughes (born 1983), American football player
- Charlotte Hughes (born 1954), American author
- Chesney Hughes (born 1991), West Indian cricketer
- Chris Hughes (disambiguation)
- Christa Hughes, Australian singer
- Christopher Hughes (disambiguation)
- Chuck Hughes (1943–1971), American football player
- Chuck Hughes (chef) (born 1976), Canadian chef
- Clara Hughes (born 1972), Canadian cyclist and speed skater
- Cledwyn Hughes (1916–2001), Welsh politician
- Cleve Hughes (born 1987), Australian rules footballer
- Clive Hughes (disambiguation)
- Coleman Hughes (born 1996), American writer
- Colin Hughes (disambiguation)
- Collingwood Hughes (1872–1963), British politician
- Connor Hughes (disambiguation)
- Corey Hughes (born 1978), Australian rugby league footballer
- Cornelius Jabez Hughes (1819–1884), British photographer
- Curtis Hughes (born 1964), American professional wrestler
- Cynthia Hughes (died 1989), Grenadian journalist

== D ==
- Dafydd Hughes (born 1996), Welsh rugby union footballer
- Daisy Marguerite Hughes (1883–1968), American painter
- Damien Hughes, Anguillan sports executive
- Danan Hughes (born 1970), American football player
- Daniel Hughes (disambiguation)
- Dante Hughes (born 1985), American football player
- Darren Hughes (disambiguation)
- David Hughes (disambiguation)
- Davis Hughes (1910–2003), Australian politician
- Dean Hughes (born 1943), American author
- Debbie Hughes (born 1958), American artist
- Debby Hughes (born 1977), South African cricketer
- Declan Hughes (disambiguation)
- Deirdre Hughes (born 1973), Irish camogie player
- Del Hughes (1909–1985), American stage manager
- Dennis Hughes (disambiguation)
- Denny Hughes (1894–1953), American football player
- Des Hughes (born 1970), British artist
- Desmond Hughes (1919–1992), Northern Irish Air Force officer
- Dessie Hughes (1943–2014), Irish racehorse trainer
- Detrick Hughes (born 1966), American poet
- Dewey Hughes (born 1932), American radio personality
- Don B. Hughes (born 1940), American politician
- Donald J. Hughes (1915–1960), American nuclear physicist
- Donna Hughes (disambiguation)
- Dorothy Hughes (disambiguation)
- Doug Hughes (born 1955), American theatre director
- Doug Hughes (activist) (born 1953), American postal worker and activist
- Dudley Mays Hughes (1848–1927), American farmer and politician
- Dusty Hughes (disambiguation)
- Dylan Hughes (born 1985), Canadian-Welsh footballer

== E ==
- E. J. Hughes (1913–2007), Canadian painter
- E. S. Hughes (1850–1926), South Australian auctioneer
- Ed Hughes (disambiguation)
- Edan Milton Hughes (1935–2015), American art dealer
- Eddie Hughes (disambiguation)
- Edith Hughes (disambiguation)
- Edna Hughes (1916–1990), English swimmer
- Edward Hughes (disambiguation)
- Edwin Hughes (disambiguation)
- Eleanor Hughes (1882–1952), New Zealand artist
- Elijah Hughes (born 1998), American basketball player
- Elisha Hughes (born 1959), Antiguan cyclist
- Elizabeth Hughes (disambiguation)
- Ellen Hughes (1867–1927), Welsh writer and suffragist
- Elwyn Hughes, Welsh author
- Emily Hughes (born 1989), American figure skater
- Emlyn Hughes (1947–2004), English footballer
- Emma Hughes (born 2000), Australian cricketer
- Emmet John Hughes (1920–1982), American editor
- Emmett Hughes (born 1987), Irish actor and producer
- Emrys Hughes (1894–1969), Welsh politician
- Emrys Hughes (rugby league), Welsh rugby league footballer
- Enoch Hughes (1829–1893), English ironworker
- Eric Hughes (disambiguation)
- Ernie Hughes (born 1955), American football player
- Ethan Hughes (born 1994), Australian rules footballer
- Eugene Hughes (disambiguation)
- Eva Hughes (1856–1940), Australian political activist
- Evan Hughes, American musician
- Everett Hughes (disambiguation)

== F ==
- Finola Hughes (born 1959), English actress
- Fiona Hughes (born 1990), English skier
- Fiona Hughes (academic), British academic
- Fountain Hughes (c. 1862–1957), American slave
- Francine Hughes (1947–2017), American nurse
- Francis Hughes (1956–1981), Irish soldier
- Francis Wade Hughes (1817–1885), American lawyer and politician
- Frank Hughes (disambiguation)
- Freddie Hughes (1943–2022), American singer
- Frederic Hughes (1858–1944), Australian general
- Frederick Hughes (disambiguation)
- Frieda Hughes (born 1960), English-Australian poet and artist
- F. W. Hughes (1869–1950), Australian businessman

== G ==
- Gabbie Hughes (born 1999), American ice hockey player
- Gabriel Hughes (born 2001), American baseball player
- Gareth Hughes (disambiguation)
- Garnet Hughes (1880–1937), Canadian military officer
- Garry or Gary Hughes (disambiguation)
- Genevieve Hughes (1932–2012), American activist
- Geoffrey Hughes (disambiguation)
- George Hughes (disambiguation)
- Geraint Hughes (born 1934), English priest
- Geraldine Hughes (born 1970), Northern Irish actress
- Gerard W. Hughes (1924–2014), Scottish priest
- Germain Hughes (born 1996), Anguillan footballer
- Gerry Hughes (disambiguation)
- Gertrude Reif Hughes (1936–2022), American professor
- Gervase Hughes (1905–1984), English composer
- Gethin Benwil Hughes, American bishop
- Gilbert Hughes, Irish politician
- Glen Hughes (born 1973), Australian rugby league footballer
- Glenn Hughes (disambiguation)
- Glyn Hughes (disambiguation)
- Gomer Hughes (1910–1974), Welsh rugby union footballer
- Gordon Hughes (born 1936), English footballer
- Graeme Hughes (born 1955), Australian cricketer
- Graham Hughes (disambiguation)
- Greg Hughes (disambiguation)
- Gregg Hughes (born 1963), American broadcaster
- Griffith William Hughes (1861–1941), Welsh musician
- Gwen Hughes (born 1963), American singer-songwriter
- Gwyn Hughes (disambiguation)
- Gwyneth Hughes, British screenwriter

== H ==
- Hamilton Hughes, Fijian rugby league footballer
- Hank Hughes (1907–1963), American football player
- Hanson Truman Hughes, American politician
- Harley Hughes (1935–2022), American Air Force officer
- Harold Hughes (1922–1996), American politician
- Harrison Hughes (1881–1958), British businessman
- Harry Hughes (disambiguation)
- Hatcher Hughes (1881–1945), American playwright
- Hector Hughes (1887–1970), Scottish politician
- Helen Hughes (disambiguation)
- Henry Hughes (disambiguation)
- Herbert Hughes (disambiguation)
- Hollie Hughes (disambiguation)
- Holly Hughes (disambiguation)
- Howard Hughes (disambiguation)
- Howell Harris Hughes (1873–1956), Welsh theologian
- Hubert Hughes (1933–2021), Anguillian politician
- Hugh Hughes (disambiguation)
- Hughes Hughes (1792–1874), British politician
- Hughie Hughes (1885–1916), British race car driver

== I ==
- Iain Hughes (born 1950), British judge
- Ian Hughes (disambiguation)
- Ieuan Hughes, British professor
- Iorwerth Hughes (1925–1993), Welsh footballer
- Irene Hughes (1920–2012), American psychic
- Isaac Hughes (disambiguation)
- Ivor Hughes (1897–1962), British Army officer

== J ==
- Jabez Hughes (1685–1731), English translator
- Jack Hughes (disambiguation)
- Jackie Hughes (1923–??), Welsh boxer
- Jahrome Hughes (born 1994), New Zealand rugby league footballer
- Jake Hughes (born 1994), British racing driver
- James Hughes (disambiguation)
- Jamie Hughes (disambiguation)
- Jana Hughes (born 1971), American politician
- Jane Hughes (disambiguation)
- Janis Hughes (born 1958), Scottish politician
- Jaquelyne Hughes, Indigenous-Australian researcher
- Jared Hughes (born 1985), American baseball player
- Jarrod Hughes (born 2005), Australian racing driver
- Jarryd Hughes (born 1995), Australian snowboarder
- Jason Hughes (disambiguation)
- Jay Hughes (disambiguation)
- Jayne Hughes, Manx judge
- Jazmine Hughes (born 1991), American writer
- Jed Hughes, American football coach
- Jedd Hughes (born 1982), Australian singer-songwriter
- Jeff Hughes (disambiguation)
- Jefferson D. Hughes III, American judge
- Jeffrey W. Hughes (born 1966), American naval admiral
- Jerahl Hughes (born 1989), English footballer
- Jerome M. Hughes (1929–2015), American politician
- Jerry Hughes (born 1988), American football player
- Jesse Hughes (disambiguation)
- Jim Hughes (disambiguation)
- Joan Hughes (1918–1993), British pilot
- Joanna Hughes (born 1977), Australian gymnast
- Jobie Hughes (born 1980), American fiction writer, part of the collective pseudonym Pittacus Lore.
- Joe Hughes (disambiguation)
- John Hughes (disambiguation)
- Jonathan Hughes (disambiguation)
- Jordan Hughes (born 1984), Canadian soccer player
- Joseph Hughes (disambiguation)
- Josephine Brawley Hughes (1839–1926), American political advocate
- Josh Hughes (born 1991), American soccer player
- Joshua Hughes (disambiguation)
- Josiah Charles Hughes (1843–1886), Canadian politician
- Judge Hughes (1944–2013), American football player and coach
- JuJu Hughes (born 1998), American football player
- Jula Hughes, American academic administrator
- Julia Pearl Hughes (1873–1950), American pharmacist
- Justin Hughes (disambiguation)

== K ==
- Karen Hughes (born 1956), French-American diplomat
- Kate Duval Hughes (1837–??), American author and inventor
- Kath Hughes, Welsh actress and comedian
- Katherine Hughes (disambiguation)
- Kathleen Hughes (1928–2025), American actress
- Kathleen Hughes (historian) (1926–1977), English historian
- Kay Hughes (1914–1998), American actress
- Keegan Hughes (born 2000), American soccer player
- Keith Hughes (disambiguation)
- Kenmore Hughes (born 1970), Antiguan sprinter
- Kenneth Hughes (disambiguation)
- Kent Hughes (disambiguation)
- Kerrie Hughes (born 1959), New Zealand fashion designer
- Kevin Hughes (disambiguation)
- Kim Hughes (disambiguation)
- Kimberly Hughes, American biologist
- Kirsten Hughes (disambiguation)
- Kitanya Hughes (born 1982), Antiguan footballer
- Kristen Hughes (born 1979), Australian netball player
- Kyle Hughes (born 1989), British motorcycle speedway rider

== L ==
- Langston Hughes (1902–1967), American poet
- Larry Hughes (born 1979), American basketball player
- Larry Hughes (politician) (1931–2000), American politician
- Laura Hughes (disambiguation)
- Lauren E. Hughes, Australian carcinologist
- Laurie Hughes (1924–2011), English footballer
- Lawrence Hughes (disambiguation)
- L. C. Hughes (1842–1915), American newspaper editor and lawyer
- Lee Hughes (born 1976), English footballer
- Len Hughes (1899–1958), English footballer
- Lena Hughes (1904–1998), American musician
- Lena B. Smithers Hughes (1905–1987), American botanist
- Leon Hughes (1930–2023), American singer
- Leonora Hughes (1897–1978), American dancer
- LeRoy Hughes (1905–1991), American football and basketball coach
- Leslie Hughes (disambiguation)
- Liam Hughes (disambiguation)
- Linda Hughes (born 1950), Canadian newspaper publisher
- Lindsey Hughes (1949–2007), British historian
- Lisabeth Tabor Hughes (born 1955), American judge
- Lloyd Hughes (disambiguation)
- Logan Hughes (born 2005), American baseball player
- Lorna M. Hughes (born 1968), British professor
- Louis Hughes (1832–1913), American author
- Louis R. Hughes (born 1949), American business executive
- Luke Hughes (disambiguation)
- Lynn Hughes (born 1941), American judge
- Lynn Hughes (artist) (born 1951), Canadian artist

== M ==
- Mackenzie Hughes (born 1990), Canadian golfer
- Madison Hughes (born 1992), American rugby sevens player
- Mal Hughes (1932–2008), English lawn bowler
- Malcolm Hughes (1920–1997), British artist
- Malcolm K. Hughes, British climatologist
- Mallie Hughes (1921–1995), Canadian ice hockey player
- Marcel Hugues (1892–1982), French soldier
- Margaret Hughes (disambiguation)
- Marian Hughes (1817–1912), English priest
- Marion Hughes (born 1968), Irish equestrian
- Marjorie Hughes (1925–2025), American singer
- Mark Hughes (disambiguation)
- Marvalene Hughes (1937–2026), American educator and administrator
- Mary Hughes (disambiguation)
- Mathew Hughes (c.1822–1882), English Victoria Cross recipient
- Matt Hughes (disambiguation)
- Maxi Hughes (born 1990), British boxer
- Meaghan Hughes (born 1986), Canadian curler
- Medwin Hughes (born 1961), British academic administrator
- Megan Hughes (born 1977), Welsh track cyclist
- Meredydd Hughes (born 1958), British police officer
- Merv Hughes (born 1961), Australian cricketer
- Mervin Ray Hughes (born 1969), American serial killer
- Michael Hughes (disambiguation)
- Mickey Hughes (1866–1931), American baseball player
- Miko Hughes (born 1986), American actor
- Mildred Barry Hughes (1902–1995), American politician
- Mimi Hughes, American swimmer
- Miriam K. Hughes (born 1945), American ambassador
- Moelwyn Hughes (1897–1955), Welsh lawyer and politician
- Mollie Hughes (born 1990), British sports adventurer
- Monica Hughes (1925–2003), English-Canadian author
- Montori Hughes (born 1990), American football player
- Morris N. Hughes Jr. (1945–2016), American ambassador
- Myra Kathleen Hughes (1877–1918), Irish artist

== N ==
- Nancy Sanford Hughes (born 1943), American entrepreneur
- Nate Hughes (born 1985), American football player
- Nathan Hughes (born 1991), Fijian rugby league footballer
- Neal Hughes (born 1980), Canadian football player
- Ned Hughes (1881–1928), New Zealand rugby union footballer
- Nerys Hughes (born 1941), Welsh actress
- Neville Hughes (1945–2015), British actor
- Nicholas Hughes (1962–2009), British biologist
- Nicola Hughes (disambiguation)
- Nina Hughes, British boxer
- Noel Hughes (1928–2011), Australian-English cricketer
- Norman Hughes (born 1952), English field hockey player

== O ==
- Obadiah Hughes (1695–1751), English minister
- Oliver Hughes (1844–1911), American Civil War soldier awarded the Medal of Honor
- Omar Hughes (born 1982), Grenadian swimmer
- Owain Arwel Hughes (born 1942), Welsh conductor
- Owen Hughes (disambiguation)

== P ==
- Pádraig Hughes, Gaelic football referee
- Parker Hughes (born 2003), American football player
- Pat Hughes (disambiguation)
- Paterson Clarence Hughes (1917–1940), Australian fighter pilot
- Patricia Hughes (disambiguation)
- Patrick Hughes (disambiguation)
- Paul Hughes (disambiguation)
- Penny Hughes (born 1959), British businesswoman
- Percy Hughes (disambiguation)
- Pete Hughes (born 1968), American college baseball coach
- Peter Hughes (disambiguation)
- Philip Hughes (disambiguation)

== Q ==
- Quentin Hughes (disambiguation)
- Quinn Hughes (born 1999), American ice hockey player

== R ==
- Ralph M. Hughes (born 1948), American politician
- Randy Hughes (born 1953), American football player
- Raymond Hughes (disambiguation)
- Regina Olson Hughes (1895–1993), American illustrator
- Reginald Hughes, rugby league player
- Renne Hughes (1941–1991), American painter
- Revella Hughes (1895–1987), American musician
- Rex Hughes (1938–2016), American basketball coach
- Rhetta Hughes (1939–2019), American singer
- Rhodri Hughes (born 1993), Welsh rugby union footballer
- Rhonda Hughes (born 1947), American mathematician
- Rhys Hughes (born 1966), Welsh writer
- Rhys Hughes (footballer) (born 2001), Welsh footballer
- Rian Hughes, British graphic designer
- Richard Hughes (disambiguation)
- R. Kent Hughes (born 1942), American pastor
- Robert Hughes (disambiguation)
- Robin Hughes (disambiguation)
- Rochford Hughes (1914–1996), British Air Force officer
- Rod Hughes (born 1954), Australian rules footballer
- Roddy Hughes (1891–1970), Welsh actor
- Rodney Hughes (1925–2005), American politician
- Roger Hughes (disambiguation)
- Ron Hughes (disambiguation)
- Ronan Hughes (born 1998), Scottish footballer
- Rowland Hughes (1896–1957), American politician
- Roy Hughes (disambiguation)
- Rupert Hughes (1872–1956), American novelist
- Russell Hughes (disambiguation)
- Ryan Hughes (disambiguation)

== S ==
- Sacha Hughes (born 1990), New Zealand sports executive
- Sali Hughes (born 1975), Welsh journalist
- Sam Hughes (disambiguation)
- Samantha Hughes (disambiguation)
- Sandra Hughes, American politician
- Sara or Sarah Hughes (disambiguation)
- Scarlett Hughes (born 2002), English cricketer
- Scott Hughes (born 1952), American architect
- Scottie Nell Hughes (born 1980), American journalist
- Séamus Hughes (1952–2022), Irish politician
- Seamus Hughes (trade unionist) (1881–1943), Irish trade unionist
- Sean Hughes (disambiguation)
- Selwyn Hughes (1928–2006), Welsh minister
- Sergio Hughes (born 2004), West Indian footballer
- Setareki Hughes (born 1995), Fijian footballer
- Shara Hughes (born 1981), American painter
- Shelby Hughes (1981–2014), American artist
- Shirley Hughes (1927–2022), English author
- Shona Powell Hughes (born 1991), Welsh rugby union footballer
- Shorty Hughes (1922–2003), American football coach
- Simon Hughes (disambiguation)
- Solomon Hughes (disambiguation)
- Sophie Hughes (born 1986), British translator
- Spencer Hughes (disambiguation)
- Spike Hughes (1908–1987), British musician
- Stephanie Hughes, New Zealand neurobiologist
- Stephen Hughes (disambiguation)
- Stuart Hughes (disambiguation)
- Sunni Hughes (born 1968), Australian footballer
- Susan Hughes (born 1960), Canadian author

== T ==
- T. A. Hughes, American politician
- T. J. Hughes (ice hockey) (born 2001), Canadian ice hockey player
- Talbot Hughes (1869–1942), British painter
- Tanya Hughes (born 1972), American high jumper
- Ted Hughes (disambiguation)
- Telly Hughes (born 1978), American television personality
- Terry Hughes (disambiguation)
- Thea Stanley Hughes (1907–1990), Australian writer
- Thomas Hughes (disambiguation)
- Tim Hughes (disambiguation)
- Toby Hughes (born 1979), English cricketer
- Todd Hughes (born 1963), American writer and film producer
- Todd M. Hughes (born 1966), American attorney and judge
- Tonda L. Hughes, American professor
- Tony Hughes (disambiguation)
- Travis Hughes (born 1978), American baseball player
- Trévon Hughes (born 1987), American basketball player
- Trevor Hughes (1925–2017), British civil servant
- Trystan Owain Hughes (born 1972), Welsh theologian
- Tyler Hughes, multiple people
- Tyrone Hughes (born 1970), American football player

== V ==
- Van Hughes (born 1960), American football player
- Vern Hughes (baseball) (1893–1961), American baseball player
- Vernon W. Hughes (1921–2003), American physicist
- Victoria Hughes (1897–1978), British lavatory attendant
- Vincent Hughes (born 1956), American politician

== W ==
- W. A. Hughes (1816–1892), British colonist
- Walter Hughes (disambiguation)
- Warren Hughes (born 1969), English racing driver
- Wayne Hughes (footballer) (born 1958), Welsh footballer
- Wayne Hughes (pastor), New Zealand minister
- Wendy Hughes (1952–2014), Australian actress
- Wilf Hughes (1910–1984), Welsh cricketer
- Wilfrid Kent Hughes (1895–1970), Australian army officer
- William Hughes (disambiguation)
- W. W. Hughes, American football coach

== Z ==
- Zharnel Hughes (born 1995), British sprinter

== See also ==
- Hughes brothers, a pair of American film directors
- Admiral Hughes (disambiguation)
- Attorney General Hughes (disambiguation)
- Governor Hughes (disambiguation)
- Judge Hughes (disambiguation)
- Justice Hughes (disambiguation)
- Lord Hughes (disambiguation)
- Senator Hughes (disambiguation)
