= Allen Hughes =

Allen Hughes may refer to:

- Allen Hughes (critic) (1921–2009), American dance and music critic
- Allen Hughes (director) (born 1972), American filmmaker
- Allen Lee Hughes, American lighting designer

== See also ==
- Alan Hughes (disambiguation)
