= Frederick Hughes =

Frederick or Fred Hughes may refer to:

- Frederick Hughes (1816–1889) of the Hughes baronets
- Frederick Hughes (footballer) (1860–?), Welsh footballer
- Frederick Hughes (sailor) (1866–1956), British Olympic sailor
- Frederick Llewelyn Hughes (1894–1967), Anglican priest and British Army chaplain
- Frederick W. Hughes (1943–2001), manager and executor of Andy Warhol
- Fred Hughes (rugby), 1940s Welsh rugby league footballer
- Fred Hughes (singer), 1960s American R&B singer
- Freddie Hughes (1943–2022), American gospel, soul, and R&B singer
- Fred G. Hughes (1837–1911), American miner, gambler, and politician
- Fred G. Hughes (newspaper publisher) (1915–1996), American newspaper publisher and FBI agent
- F. W. Hughes (Fred William Hughes, 1869–1950), Australian businessman

== See also ==
- Frederic Hughes (1858–1944), Australian World War I general
