= Jack Hughes (disambiguation) =

Jack Hughes (born 2001) is an American ice hockey forward.

Jack Hughes may also refer to:

- Jack Hughes (footballer, born 1852) (1852–?) English footballer and umpire
- Jack Hughes (footballer, born 1866) (1866–?), English footballer
- Jack Hughes (ice hockey, born 1890) (1890–1962), Canadian ice hockey centre and coach
- Jack Hughes (trade unionist) (1910–1998), Australian trade unionist and communist
- Jack Hughes (footballer, born 1912) (1912–1991), English footballer
- Jack Hughes (ice hockey, born 1957), American ice hockey forward
- Jack Hughes (rugby league) (born 1992), English rugby league footballer
- Jack Hughes (rugby league, born 2000), English rugby league footballer
- Jackie Hughes (1923–?), Welsh boxer

== See also ==
- John Hughes (disambiguation)
- Jack Hues (born 1954), British musician
- J'Accuse...!
