= List of Charles Darwin University people =

This is an incomplete list of Charles Darwin University people, including alumni and staff.

== Notable alumni ==
- Loraine Braham
- James Burke
- Sue Carter
- Lia Finocchiaro
- Michael Gunner
- Lauren Moss
- Chansey Paech

== Administration ==
=== Chancellors ===
| Order | Chancellor | Title | Term start | Term end | Time in office | Notes |
|---|---|---|---|---|---|---|
| 1 | Austin Asche AC, QC | Chancellor of the Northern Territory University | 28 April 1989 | 26 February 1993 | 3 years, 304 days | |
| 2 | Nan Giese AO, OBE | Chancellor of the Northern Territory University | February 1993 | 2003 | 9–10 years | |
| 3 | Richard Ryan AO | Chancellor of Charles Darwin University | 2003 | December 2009 | 5–6 years | |
| 4 | Sally Thomas AC | Chancellor of Charles Darwin University | 1 January 2010 | 21 April 2016 | 6 years, 111 days | |
| 5 | Neil Balnaves AO | Chancellor of Charles Darwin University | 22 April 2016 | 2018 | 9 years, 341 days | |
| 6 | Paul Henderson AO | Chancellor of Charles Darwin University | 22 February 2019 | Current | | |

=== Vice-Chancellors ===
| Order | Vice-Chancellor | Title | Years | Notes |
|---|---|---|---|---|
| 1 | Malcolm Nairn | Vice-Chancellor of the Northern Territory University | 1989–???? | |
| 2 | Roger Holmes | Vice-Chancellor of the Northern Territory University | 2000–2000 | |
| 3 | Ron McKay | Vice-Chancellor of the Northern Territory University | 2000–2002 | |
| 4 | Ken McKinnon | Interim Vice-Chancellor of the Northern Territory University | 2002–2003 | |
| 5 | Helen Garnett | Vice-Chancellor of Charles Darwin University | 2003–2008 | |
| 6 | Barney Glover | Vice-Chancellor of Charles Darwin University | 2009–2014 | |
| 7 | Simon Maddocks | Vice-Chancellor of Charles Darwin University | 2014–2020 | |
| 8 | Mike Wilson | Interim Vice-Chancellor of Charles Darwin University | 2020 – May 2021 | |
| 9 | Scott Bowman AO | Vice-Chancellor and President of Charles Darwin University | May 2021 – current | |

== Faculty ==
- Tim Berra
- Keith Christian
- Gail Garvey, epidemiological oncologist, Menzies School of Health
- Yingiya Mark Guyula
- Hugh Hickling
- Jaquelyne Hughes, nephrologist
- Martin Jarvis, professor and lecturer of music
- Clare Martin
- Alan Powell
- Helen Verran
