= James Hughes =

James, Jamie, Jim, or Jimmy Hughes may refer to:

== Law and politics ==
=== U.S. ===
- James Hughes (Indiana politician) (1823–1873), American politician from Indiana
- James A. Hughes (1861–1930), American politician from West Virginia
- James B. Hughes (1805–1873), American newspaper publisher and politician from Ohio
- James H. Hughes (1867–1953), American lawyer and politician from Delaware
- James Madison Hughes (1809–1861), American politician from Missouri
- James P. Hughes (1874–1961), American judge from Indiana
- James F. Hughes (1883–1940), American politician from Wisconsin
- James W. Hughes (died 1955), American politician and newspaperman from Virginia
- Jim Hughes (politician) (born 1964), American politician from Ohio

=== Elsewhere ===
- James Hughes (British politician) (died 1845), British Member of Parliament for Grantham
- James Joseph Hughes (1856–1941), Canadian Senator and Member of Parliament
- James Hughes (Irish politician) (1895–1948), Irish Fine Gael politician
- Jim Hughes (academic) (born 1959), British political scientist
- James Hughes (Canadian politician)

== Sports ==
=== Association football (soccer) ===
- James Hughes (footballer, born 1885) (1885–1948), English footballer who played for Liverpool
- Jimmy Hughes (footballer) (1909–1966), English footballer
- James Hughes (footballer, born 1911) (1911–?), English footballer who played for Bristol City
- Jim Hughes (footballer, born 1960), Scottish footballer
- Jim Hughes (footballer, born 1965), Scottish footballer
- Jamie Hughes (footballer) (born 1977), English footballer

=== Baseball ===
- Jay Hughes (a.k.a. Jim Hughes, 1874–1924), American baseball pitcher
- Jim Hughes (1950s pitcher) (1923–2001), American baseball pitcher
- Jim Hughes (1970s pitcher) (born 1951), American baseball pitcher

=== Other sports ===
- James Hughes (rugby union) (1886–1943), Australian rugby union player
- James Hughes (ice hockey) (1906–1983), Canadian professional ice hockey player
- Jim Hughes (Canadian football) (1934–2004), Canadian football player
- James Hughes (boxer) (1965–1995), American flyweight boxer
- Jamie Hughes (darts player) (born 1986), English darts player

== Others ==
- James Hughes (bishop) (1894–1979), British Anglican bishop
- James D. Hughes (1922–2024), American Air Force lieutenant general
- Jimmy Hughes (singer) (1938-2026), American soul singer
- Jimmy Hughes (British musician) (born 1958), British punk rock/New Wave bassist
- James Hughes (sociologist) (born 1961), American sociologist and bioethicist

== Other uses ==
- Jimmy Hughes, Rookie Cop, American television show (1953)

== See also ==
- Hughes (surname)
