= Wind of Change =

Wind(s) of Change may refer to:

== Books ==
- Winds of Change, 1973 book by Yashwantrao Chavan
- Winds of Change, the 2021 manga novel in the Warriors series by Erin Hunter
- Wind of Change, romantic novel by Nora Roberts
- Wind of Change: The Scorpions Story, by Martin Popoff
- The Winds of Change and Other Stories, a collection of short stories by Isaac Asimov
- The Winds of Change by Martha Grimes in the Richard Jury series
- Winds of Change, novel by Anna Jacobs
- Winds of Change (Lackey novel), a 1994 novel by Mercedes Lackey
- Winds of Change: The Future of Democracy in Iran, a 2002 book by Reza Pahlavi, Crown Prince of Iran
- Winds of Change: Britain in the Early Sixties, by Peter Hennessy
- Winds of Change: The Roman Catholic Church and Society in Wales, 1916–1962, by Trystan Owain Hughes

== Film and television ==
- The Wind of Change (film), a 1961 British film
- Winds of Change (1979 film) or Metamorphoses, an anime film
- Winds of Change, the working title for the 2012 film Midnight's Children
- Wind of Change (Bangladeshi TV program), a music performance show
- "Winds of Change", an episode of Ninjago: Possession, the fifth season of Ninjago: Masters of Spinjitzu
- Wind of Change (2027 film), a biographical film of the German hard rock band Scorpions

== Music ==
=== Albums ===
- Winds of Change (Eric Burdon & the Animals album) or its title song
- Wind of Change (album), a 1972 album by Peter Frampton
- Winds of Change (Jefferson Starship album) or its title song
- Wind of Change, a 2009 album by Sound of the Blue Heart
- The Winds of Change, a 2023 album by Billy Childs

=== Songs ===
- "Wind of Change" (Scorpions song) (1990)
- "Winds of Change", from the Beach Boys' M.I.U. Album
- "Wind of Change", a song from the Bee Gees album Main Course
- "Winds of Change", from the Black Hour Sins Remain
- "Wind of Change", from the Acoustic Alchemy album AArt
- "Wind of Change", from the Badger album One Live Badger
- "The Winds of Change", from the Mike Batt album Waves
- "Winds of Change", from the Cinderella album Heartbreak Station
- "Winds of Change", from the Fitz and the Tantrums album Pickin' Up the Pieces
- "Wind of Change", from the Hawkwind album Hall of the Mountain Grill
- "Winds of Change", from the Kutless album Hearts of the Innocent
- "Winds of Change" from the Russ Taff album The Way Home
- "The Wind of Change", by Robert Wyatt with the SWAPO Singers
- "Winds of Change", from the Y&T album Black Tiger
- "Winds of Change", by Firefall from the Élan album

== Other uses ==
- "Wind of Change" (speech), a 1960 speech by British Prime Minister Harold Macmillan to the Parliament of South Africa
- Winds of Change (magazine), published by the American Indian Science and Engineering Society
- The Winds of Change, a wrestling maneuver used by Wade Barrett
- Winds of Change, a 2010 Bistro Award-winning one-man show by Lee Summers
- Wind of Change (podcast), a 2020 podcast hosted by Patrick Radden Keefe
- Wind of Change (wind turbine), a wind turbine in Skara, Sweden on a wooden tower
