= Matt Hughes =

Matt or Matthew Hughes may refer to:

- Matt Hughes (fighter) (born 1973), American professional mixed martial artist
- Matt Hughes (rower) (born 1981), American Olympic rower
- Matt Hughes (writer) (born 1949), Canadian science fiction writer
- Matthew Hughes (badminton) (born 1978), Welsh badminton player
- Matthew Hughes (cricketer) (born 1996), English cricketer
- Matthew Hughes (politician) (born 1950), Western Australian state politician
- Matthew Hughes (runner) (born 1989), Canadian athlete
- Matt Hughes (storm chaser) (died 2010), meteorologist, storm chaser on the TV series Storm Chasers

== See also ==
- Mathew Hughes (1822–1882), Victoria Cross recipient
- Hughes (surname)
