= Edwin Hughes =

Edwin Hughes may refer to:

- Edwin Hughes (footballer) (1885-1949), Welsh footballer
- Edwin Hughes (musician) (1884–1965), American pianist, teacher, music editor, and composer
- Edwin Hughes (politician) (1832–1904), English solicitor and Conservative politician
- Edwin Hughes (soldier) (1830–1927), last survivor of the Charge of the Light Brigade
- Edwin Holt Hughes (1866–1950), American bishop of the Methodist Episcopal Church
- Edwin Sawle Hughes (1850–1926), auctioneer and naturalist in South Australia

== See also ==
- Hughes (surname)
