= Alfred Hughes =

Alfred Hughes may refer to:

== Sports ==
- Alfred Hughes (sailor) (1868–1935), British Olympic sailor
- Alf Hughes (1930–2019), Australian rules footballer
- Alfredrick Hughes (born 1962), American basketball player

== Others ==
- Alfred Clifton Hughes (born 1932), retired American prelate of the Roman Catholic Church, Archbishop of New Orleans 2002-2009
- Sir Alfred Hughes, 9th Baronet (1825–1898), of the Hughes baronets
- Alfred W Hughes, served as a surgeon in the Second Boer War, see Hughes Memorial, Corris
