= Amy Hughes =

Amy Hughes can refer to:

- Amy Hughes (administrator) (1856–1923), British nursing administrator
- Amy Hughes (artist), British contemporary artist
- Amy Hughes (runner), British marathon runner
- Amy Hughes, woman shot by police in Tucson, Arizona, leading to US Supreme Court case Kisela v. Hughes
