= Arthur Hughes =

Arthur Hughes may refer to:

== Arts and entertainment ==
- Arthur Hughes (American actor) (1894–1982), American actor on the stage, radio and films
- Arthur Hughes (artist) (1832–1915), English painter and illustrator
- Arthur Hughes (British actor) (born 1992), British actor on stage, radio and television
- Arthur Foord Hughes (1856–1934), English artist
- Arthur Wellesley Hughes (1870–1950), Canadian musician and composer
- Frank Randle (1901–1957), English comedian, born as Arthur Hughes

== Sports ==
- Art Hughes (American soccer) (born 1965), American soccer player
- Art Hughes (Canadian soccer) (1930–2019), Canadian soccer player
- Arthur Hughes (English footballer) (1883–1962), English footballer for Bolton Wanderers, Southampton and Manchester City
- Arthur Hughes (rugby union) (1924–2005), New Zealand rugby union player
- Arthur Hughes (Scottish footballer) (1927–2015), Scottish footballer for Grimsby Town and Gillingham
- Arthur Hughes (Welsh footballer) (1884–1970), Chirk F.C. and Wales international footballer

== Others ==
- Arthur Hughes (bishop) (1902–1949), British Roman Catholic bishop
- Arthur Hughes (politician) (1885–1968), Australian politician
- Arthur William Hughes (1883–1964), British businessman in Hong Kong
- Arthur Hayden Hughes (born 1939), United States Ambassador to Yemen, 1991–1994
- Arthur Labinjo‑Hughes (2014-2020), English murder victim

== See also ==
- Hughes (surname)
