= Colin Hughes (disambiguation) =

Colin Hughes (1930–2017) was a British-Australian academic specialising in electoral politics and government.

Colin Hughes may also refer to:

- Colin Hughes (microbiologist) (born 1953)
- Colin Hughes, a penname of English author John Creasey (1908–1973)
- Colin Hughes, a fictional footballer in the Apple TV series Ted Lasso
