= Terry Hughes =

Terry Hughes may refer to:

- Terry Hughes (baseball) (born 1949), American Major League Baseball player
- Terry Hughes (biologist) (born 1956), Irish-Australian biologist
- Terry Hughes (director), British comedy television director
- Terry Hughes (politician), California State Legislature member
- Terry Hughes (rugby league), Australian rugby league footballer
- Terry Hughes (weightlifter) (born 1964), New Zealander weightlifter

== Fictional characters ==
- Terry Hughes, in the UK TV sitcom Fawlty Towers, played by Brian Hall

== See also ==
- Hughes (surname)
