= Alexander Hughes (disambiguation) =

Alexander Hughes (1907–1977) was an English footballer.

Alexander Hughes may also refer to:

- Judge Dread (Alexander Minto Hughes, 1945–1998), English reggae and ska musician
- Alexander Hughes (MP), Member of Parliament (MP) for Wareham in 1554
- Alex Hughes (cartoonist) (born 1971), English freelance cartoonist, caricaturist and illustrator
- Alex Hughes (cricketer) (born 1991), English cricketer
- Alex Hughes (priest) (born 1975), Church of England priest and Archdeacon of Cambridge
- Alexander Warren Hughes (born 2000), American singer, known as Alex Warren
- Alex Hughes, played by Alan Rickman in the film Snow Cake

== See also ==
- Hughes (surname)
