= Eric Hughes =

Eric Hughes may refer to:

- Eric Hughes (basketball) (born 1965), American basketball coach
- Eric Hughes (cypherpunk), American mathematician and cypherpunk
- Eric Hughes (rugby, born 1950), English rugby union and rugby league player
- Eric Hughes (rugby league, born 1913) (1913–2012), Australian rugby league player
- Eric Brian Hughes (born 1968), American film director
