= Dennis Hughes =

Dennis Hughes may refer to:

- Denis M. Hughes, American chairman
- Dennis Hughes (American football) (born 1948), American football player
- Dennis Hughes (footballer) (1931–1990), English footballer
- Dennis Hughes (rugby union) (born 1941), former Welsh rugby union international player
- Dennis Hughes (snooker player) (born 1937), English snooker player
- Denny Hughes (1894–1953), American football player
