= Peter Hughes =

Peter Hughes may refer to:

- Pete Hughes (born 1968), American college baseball coach
- Peter Hughes (actor) (1922–2019), English actor
- Peter Hughes (Australian politician) (born 1932), former Australian politician
- Peter Hughes (diplomat) (born 1953), British former ambassador to North Korea
- Peter Hughes (footballer) (1934–2020), Australian rules footballer
- Peter Hughes (Irish politician) (died 1954)
- Peter Hughes (musician), member of the Mountain Goats (American folk rock band)
- Peter Hughes (South African soccer), active in the 1950s
- Peter Tuesday Hughes (1940–2005), American science fiction and mystery author
- Peter Marcus Hughes, one of the three men convicted of the 2010 murder of Vincent Binder

== See also ==
- Hughes (surname)
