= Andrew Hughes =

Andrew Hughes may refer to:

- Andrew Hughes (actor) (1908–1996), Turkish-born actor
- Andrew Hughes (footballer, born 1978), English footballer
- Andrew Hughes (footballer, born 1992), Welsh footballer
- Andrew Hughes (musicologist) (1937–2013), English musicologist
- Andrew Hughes (police officer) (1956–2018), Fijian commissioner of police
- Andrew Hughes (politician) (1902–1996), Australian politician
- Andrew Hughes (rugby union) (born 1995), English rugby union player
- Andrew D. Hughes (born 1985/1986), American political staffer
- Andy Hughes (1965–2009), music producer

== See also ==
- Hughes (surname)
