= Eugene Hughes =

Eugene Hughes may refer to:

- Eugene Hughes (educator) (1934–2021), American university president
- Eugene Hughes (Gaelic footballer) (1957/1958–2025), Irish Gaelic football player for Monaghan
- Eugene Hughes (snooker player) (born 1955), Irish snooker player
- Eugene Orlando Hughes (born 1969), Irish filmmaker and psychotherapist
