= Adam Hughes (disambiguation) =

Adam Hughes (born 1967) is an American comic book illustrator.

Adam Hughes may also refer to:

- Adam Hughes (poet) (born 1982), American poet
- Adam Hughes (rugby, born 1977), English-born Welsh rugby league and rugby league footballer
- Adam Hughes (rugby union, born 1990), Welsh rugby union player
- Adam Hughes (soccer) (born 1982), Australian association footballer
- Adam Hughes (volleyball) (born 1986), American volleyball coach
- Adam Munson, also known as Adam Hughes, fictional character

== See also ==
- Hughes (surname)
