= Darren Hughes (disambiguation) =

Darren Hughes (born 1978) is a New Zealand politician.

Darren Hughes may also refer to:

- Darren Hughes (English footballer) (born 1965), English footballer
- Darren Hughes (Gaelic footballer), Irish footballer
- Darren Hughes (gridiron football) (born 1967), American player of gridiron football

== See also ==
- Hughes (surname)
