= Cameron Hughes =

Cameron Hughes may refer to the following:

- Cameron Hughes (ice hockey) (born 1996), Canadian ice hockey player
- Cameron Hughes (sports entertainer), Canadian sports entertainer
