= Geoffrey Hughes =

Geoffrey Hughes may refer to:

- Geoff Hughes (born 1939), Australian tennis player
- Geoffrey Hughes (actor) (1944–2012), English actor
- Geoffrey Forrest Hughes (1895–1951), Australian aviator and pilot

== See also ==
- Jeff Hughes (disambiguation), multiple people
- Jeffrey W. Hughes (born 1966), American naval admiral
