= Katherine Hughes =

Katherine or Catherine Hughes may refer to:

- Kate Duval Hughes (1837–?), American author and inventor
- Katherine Hughes (activist) (1876–1925), Canadian writer, archivist and political activist
- Kay Hughes (Catherine Mary Hughes, 1914–1998), American actress
- Catherine Hughes (diplomat) (1933–2014), British diplomat and principal of Somerville College, Oxford
  - Catherine Hughes Building, a building of Somerville College, Oxford
- Cathy Hughes (born 1947), American TV personality
- Kathryn Hughes (born 1959), British historian, journalist and biographer
- Catherine Andrea Hughes, Guyanese politician
- Kath Hughes (born 1988), Welsh actress, writer and comedian
- Katherine Hughes (actress) (born 1995), American actress
- Kate Hughes (Emmerdale), fictional character on the British TV soap Emmerdale
