= Howard Hughes (disambiguation) =

Howard Hughes (1905–1976) was an American aviator, movie producer, and industrialist

Howard Hughes may also refer to:

- Howard R. Hughes Sr. (1869–1924), industrialist and inventor and father of Howard Hughes (1905–1976)
- Howard Hughes (murderer) (born 1965), British paedophile and murderer
- Howard W. Hughes (1891–1945), American judge
- Howard Hughes (radio presenter), British news presenter, disk-jockey and voice-over artist
- Howard Hughes Engineering, an Australian company manufacturing boats and aircraft
- Howie Hughes (1939–2025), Canadian professional ice hockey player
