= Jesse Hughes =

Jesse Hughes may refer to:

- Jesse Hughes (frontiersman) (c. 1750 – c. 1829), pioneer and scout in western Virginia
- Jesse Hughes (DJ) (born 1989), Canadian DJ and producer
- Jesse Hughes (musician) (born 1972), American musician

== See also ==
- Hughes (surname)
