= Percy Hughes =

Percy Hughes may refer to:

- Percy Hughes (footballer) (1868–?), Welsh international footballer
- Percy Hughes (philosopher) (1872–1952), American philosopher and teacher

== See also ==
- Hughes (surname)
