= Richard Hughes =

Richard, Richy, Rick or Dick Hughes may refer to:

== Arts and entertainment ==
- Richard Hughes (poet) (c. 1565–1619), Welsh poet
- Richard Hughes (British writer) (1900–1976), British poet, novelist and playwright
- Richard E. Hughes (1909–1974), American comics writer
- Richard N. Hughes (1927–2004), American television executive and television station editorialist
- Dick Hughes (musician) (1931–2018), Australian musician
- Richy Hughes (born 1974), British musical theatre lyricist
- Richard Hughes (musician) (born 1975), English drummer with Keane

== Sports ==
- Dick Hughes (footballer) (1902–1984), English footballer
- Richard Hughes (cricketer) (1926–2020), English cricketer
- Dick Hughes (American football) (born 1932), American football player
- Dick Hughes (baseball) (1938–2026), American baseball player
- Rick Hughes (born 1973), American basketball player
- Richard Hughes (jockey) (born 1973), Irish jockey
- Richard Hughes (footballer) (born 1979), Scottish footballer

== Others ==
- Sir Richard Hughes, 1st Baronet (c. 1708–1779), British naval commander
- Sir Richard Hughes, 2nd Baronet (c. 1729–1812), British naval officer and lieutenant-governor of Nova Scotia
- Richard Bannister Hughes (1810–1875), British businessman in Uruguay
- Richard Hughes (archdeacon of Bangor) (1881–1962), British cleric
- Richard Hughes (journalist) (1906–1984), Australian journalist
- Richard J. Hughes (1909–1992), American lawyer and politician; governor and later chief justice of New Jersey
- Richard Cyril Hughes (1932–2022), Welsh historian
- Richard W. Hughes (fl. 1980s–2020s), American gemologist

== See also ==
- Hughes (surname)
