= Paul Hughes =

Paul Hughes may refer to:

- Paul Hughes (athlete), British Paralympic athlete
- Paul Hughes (footballer) (born 1976), English footballer
- Paul Hughes (priest) (born 1953), Archdeacon of Bedford
- Paul Hughes (rugby league), rugby league footballer
- Paul Hughes (fighter) (born 1997), professional mixed martial artist

== See also ==
- Hughes (surname)
