= Kerrie Hughes =

New Zealand fashion designer

Kerrie Hughes (born 1959) is a New Zealand fashion designer who established the international fashion brand Idol in 1990. Her work is held in the permanent collection of the Victoria and Albert Museum.

== Early life ==
Hughes was born in 1959 in Lower Hutt, Wellington. Her father was the head of Rembrandt, a men's suit manufacturer, and Hughes was taught to sew by him. She had two years as a dressmaking apprentice before enrolling at Wellington Polytechnic. After graduation in 1979, Hughes established her first business Svelt, with classmate Di Jennings. Their first store was on Cuba Street in Wellington.

== Career ==
After graduating from the Polytech, Hughes worked as an assistant costume designer for the New Zealand Opera and Royal New Zealand Ballet.

Svelt's work was exhibited in fashion shows at Wellington nightclubs. Hughes and Jennings orchestrated these events as performance pieces as opposed to strictly commercial shows. The flamboyant nature of the events was used to attract new clients such as Judith Fyfe.

In 1982, they attempted to establish a store in Auckland but were unsuccessful.

In 1984 Hughes returned to Wellington and opened 'Siren' in Ghuznee St.In 1984 and in 1985 she was awarded Highly Commended at the Benson and Hedges Fashion Design Awards. This was followed in 1986 by a grant from the Queen Elizabeth II Arts Council to tour and study the costume collections of the Metropolitan Museum of Art, the Los Angeles County Museum and the Victoria and Albert Museum.

Her education continued in London, where she completed a Masters in Fashion at St. Martins School of Art in 1988. Through living in London she was able to work with Zhandra Rhodes and as an assistant designer for Murray Arbeid.

In 1990 she established the international fashion brand Idol. She worked on this brand while living in London and operated a shop from Soho. Garments in the brand were featured on television shows that included Absolutely Fabulous and Friends. Her work was also shown in Vogue.
