= Howard W. Hughes =

American judge

Associate Justice of the Supreme Court of Pennsylvania
- In office December 30, 1943 – January 1, 1945

Personal details
- Born: 1891
- Died: 1945 (aged 53–54)
- Education: Washington & Jefferson College (BA, MA); Harvard Law School (LLB)
- Occupation: jurist

Howard W. Hughes was an Associate Justice of the Supreme Court of Pennsylvania. His term started in 1943 until 1945. Prior to this, he was a district attorney and judge in Washington County.
