= Glenn Hughes =

Glenn Hughes or Glen Hughes may refer to:

- Glenn Hughes (producer), American theater producer (1894–1964)
- Glenn Hughes (American singer) (1950–2001)
- Glenn Hughes (musician), English musician, born 1951
- Glenn Hughes (cricketer), Australian cricketer, born 1959
- Glen Hughes, Australian rugby league player, born 1973
