= Helen Hughes =

Helen Hughes may refer to:

- Helen Hughes (actress) (1918–2018), American-born Canadian actress
- Helen Hughes (economist) (1928–2013), Australian economist
- Helen Hughes (scientist) (1929–2024), New Zealand botanist
- Helen MacGill Hughes (1903–1992), Canadian sociologist and feminist
- Helen Slayton-Hughes (1930–2022), American actress
- Helen Hughes (EastEnders)
