= Keith Hughes =

Keith Hughes may refer to:

- Keith Hughes (baseball) (born 1963), American professional baseball outfielder
- Keith Hughes (basketball) (1968–2014), basketball player
- Keith Hughes (rugby union) (born 1949), Welsh rugby union player
- Keith F. Hughes (1936–2021), American lawyer and politician
