= Toby Hughes =

English cricketer

Personal information
- Full name: Toby Roger Hughes
- Born: 15 February 1979 (age 47); Stourport-on-Severn, Worcestershire, England
- Batting: Right-handed
- Bowling: Right-arm medium-fast

Domestic team information
- Years: Team
- 2000–2001: Cambridge University
- 2001–2002: Cambridge UCCE

Career statistics
Competition	First-class
Matches	11
Runs scored	38
Batting average	4.75
100s/50s	–/–
Top score	13*
Balls bowled	1,530
Wickets	17
Bowling average	50.76
5 wickets in innings	–
10 wickets in match	–
Best bowling	3/55
Catches/stumpings	1/–
- Source: Cricinfo, 15 August 2020

Toby Roger Hughes (born 15 February 1979) is an English former first-class cricketer.

Hughes was born at Stourport-on-Severn in February 1979. He was educated at Oldbury Wells School, before going up to Homerton College, Cambridge. While studying at Cambridge, he played first-class cricket for both Cambridge University and Cambridge UCCE from 2000–02. (Note: Cambridge UCCE differed from Cambridge University Cricket Club in that it was open to students at Anglia Ruskin University, whereas Cambridge University Cricket Club is exclusively for students of the constituent colleges of the University of Cambridge.) He made seven appearances for Cambridge University, which included two appearances in The University Match against Oxford, in addition to four appearances for Cambridge UCCE. Playing as a right-arm medium-fast bowler, he took 17 wickets in his eleven first-class matches, at an average of 50.76, with best figures of 3 for 55. 13 of these wickets came for Cambridge University.
