= Leslie Hughes =

Leslie Hughes may refer to:

- Les Hughes (1884–1962), Australian rules footballer
- Lesley Hughes, Canadian politician
- Leslie Mark Hughes (born 1963), Welsh footballer and manager
