= Elizabeth Hughes =

Elizabeth Hughes may refer to:

- Elizabeth Hughes Gossett (1907–1981), née Elizabeth Hughes, early patient treated with insulin
- Elizabeth Hughes (legislator) (1875–1941), American politician
- Elizabeth Phillips Hughes (1851–1925), Welsh scholar, teacher, and promoter of women's education
- Elizabeth Josephine Brawley Hughes (1839–1926), advocate of women's rights in the United States
