= Carol Hughes =

Carol Hughes may refer to:

- Carol Hughes (actress) (1910–1995), American actress
- Carol Hughes (author) (born 1961), British American children's writer
- Carol Hughes (Hughes), widow of the English poet Ted Hughes (died 1998)
- Carol Hughes (politician) (born 1958), Canadian politician
- Carol Hughes (producer), producer of the 1993 Australian film Say a Little Prayer
