= George Hughes =

George Hughes may refer to:

- George Hughes (American football) (1925–2009), NFL player
- George Hughes (cricketer) (1821–1872), English cricketer and the basis for the literary character Tom Brown
- George Hughes (engineer) (1865–1945), British locomotive engineer
- George Hughes (ice hockey) (born 1988), American professional ice hockey defenceman
- George Hughes (priest) (1603–1667), English Puritan priest and writer
- George Hughes (rugby) (1870–1947), rugby union footballer of the 1890s for England, and Barrow
- George Hughes (1889–1930), African American lynched in Sherman, Texas, see lynching of George Hughes
- George E. Hughes (1853–1937), merchant and political figure in Prince Edward Island, Canada
- George Edward Hughes (1918–1994), professor of philosophy at the Victoria University of Wellington
- George O. Hughes (born 1962), Ghanaian-born American artist
- George Wurtz Hughes (1806–1870), U.S. congressman from Maryland
- Pat Hughes (tennis) (George Patrick Hughes, 1902–1997), English tennis player
- George Hughes, Australian printer, see George Howe
