= Donna Hughes =

Donna Hughes may refer to:

- Donna Hughes (musician), bluegrass musician
- Donna M. Hughes (born 1954), feminist scholar and anti-prostitution and anti-trafficking activist
- Donna Rice Hughes (born 1958), former associate of US Senator Gary Hart and anti-pornography activist
