= Clive Hughes =

Clive Hughes may refer to:

- Clive Hughes (Queensland politician) (1924–2014), Australian politician
- Clive Hughes (Western Australian politician) (1947–1986), Australian politician
