= Lloyd Hughes =

Lloyd Hughes may refer to:

- Lloyd Hughes (actor) (1897–1958), American film actor
- Lloyd Hughes (jockey), jockey in the 1878 and 1881 Withers Stakes
- Lloyd Hughes (politician) (1912–1994), Australian politician
- Lloyd Herbert Hughes (1921–1943), American Air Force pilot
