= Governor Hughes =

Governor Hughes may refer to:

- L. C. Hughes (1842–1915), 11th Governor of Arizona Territory from 1893 to 1896
- Charles Evans Hughes (1862–1948), 36th governor of New York from 1907 to 1910
- Harry Hughes (born 1926), 57th governor of Maryland from 1979 to 1987
- Harold Hughes (1922–1996), 36th governor of Iowa from 1963 to 1969
- Richard J. Hughes (1909–1992), 45th governor of New Jersey from 1962 to 1970
