= Ryan Hughes =

Ryan Hughes may refer to:

- Ryan Hughes (footballer) (born 2001), English footballer
- Ryan Hughes (ice hockey) (born 1972), Canadian ice hockey player
- Ryan Hughes (poker player) (born 1981), American poker player
- Ryan Hughes (motocross) (born 1973), American motocross competitor; see 2010 FIM Motocross World Championship
- Ryan Hughes (writer) (born 1957), pen name of American science fiction novelist Jerry Oltion

== See also ==
- Hughes–Ryan Act, a 1974 United States federal law that amended the Foreign Assistance Act of 1961
