= Ron Hughes =

Ron or Ronald Hughes may refer to:

- Ron Hughes (American football) (1943–2019), American football scout and executive
- Ron Hughes (footballer, born 1930) (1930–2019), Welsh football player for Chester City F.C.
- Ron Hughes (footballer, born 1955) (born 1955), English football goalkeeper for Workington A.F.C.
- Ronald Hughes (1935–1970), attorney involved in Manson case
- Ronald Laurence Hughes (1920–2003), Australian Army officer
- Ron Hughes (hurdler) (born c. 1943), American hurdler, 1965 NCAA indoor runner-up in the sprint hurdles for the Kent State Golden Flashes track and field team
