= Sarah Hughes (disambiguation) =

Sarah Hughes (born 1985) is an American figure skater.

Sarah or Sara Hughes may also refer to:

- Sarah A. Hughes (1847-1916), American African Methodist Episcopal preacher
- Sarah T. Hughes (1896–1985), United States District Court judge
- Sara Hughes (artist) (born 1971), Canadian-born New Zealand artist
- Sarah Hughes (journalist) (1972–2021), British journalist
- Sara Hughes (born 1995), American beach volleyball player
- Sarah Hewson (née Hughes), British news reporter
- Sarah Hughes, fictional character in the Hellboy franchise, being Hellboy's biological mother
- Sarah Hughes Brewery, brewery in Sedgley, England
