= Renne Hughes =

American painter

- Born: August 18, 1941; Lamesa, Texas
- Died: October 30, 1991 (aged 50)
- Occupations: Painter and Photographer
- Notable work: Bluebonnets in Bloom; Portrait of a Cowboy; Sunset over the Plains

Renne Hughes (August 18, 1941 – October 30, 1991) born in Lamesa, Texas, was an American painter and photographer who became known for his depictions of the American West. Hughes won awards and achievements across the U.S. and abroad and in 1978 he was officially awarded the Texas State Artist title. Notable paintings by Hughes include "Portrait of a Cowboy" and "Sunset over the Plains," as well as "Bluebonnets in Bloom," which he gifted to former U.S. President Ronald Reagan.

== Early life ==
Renne was born to Jack B. Hughes and Mabel Dean Sasser in 1941. His father was a record holder athlete at the University of Texas in Austin and was a discus contender in the 1940 Summer Olympics before they were cancelled due to World War II. He spent his childhood in the Texas country and began to create drawings, sketches and began working with oil paints. The family later moved to Lake Worth, Texas, where he eventually attended Arlington Heights high school and was a champion body builder at LCRA. He later attended Texas Christian University for an engineering degree where he met his wife, Laura Shesa.

== Notes ==
www.rennehughes.org
