= Bradley Hughes =

Bradley Hughes may refer to:

- Bradley Hughes (golfer) (born 1967), Australian golfer
- Bradley T. Hughes, programmer and developer of the Blackbox window manager
- B. Wayne Hughes (1933–2021), American businessman, founder of Public Storage
