= Walter Hughes =

Walter Hughes may refer to:

- Wally Hughes (1934–2011), New Zealand footballer
- Walter Hughes (cricketer) (1882–1917), Australian cricketer
- Walter Hughes (pastoralist) (1803–1887), Australian pastoralist and public benefactor
- W. W. Hughes (Walter Watson Hughes; fl. 1902–1903), American football coach
