= Cameron Hughes (sports entertainer) =

Canadian sports entertainer

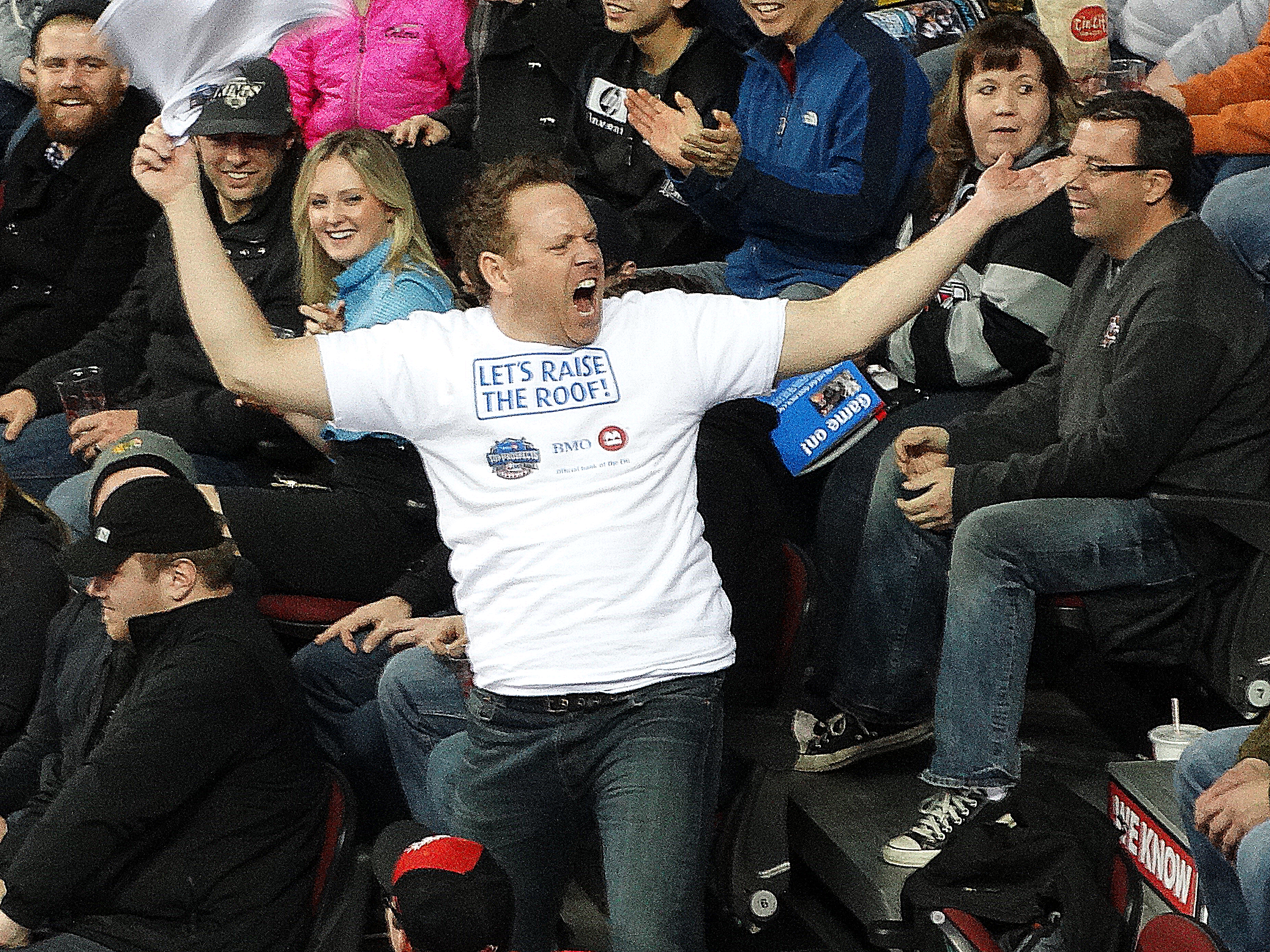
Cameron Hughes in 2014

Cameron Hughes is a Canadian crowd igniter, professional speaker and sports entertainer.

== Early life and education ==
Hughes was born in Ottawa, Canada. He attended Rockcliffe Park Public School in Ottawa and Lisgar Collegiate, graduating and serving as class president in 1990. He then studied sociology at Bishop's University in Lennoxville, Quebec. At an alumni event in 2022, he was called the "most viral" graduate of all time.

== Sports entertainment ==
Hughes is paid by sports teams to attend their games and energize fans. The only professional sports entertainer of his kind in the world, Cameron has performed at over 1,500 events including two Olympic Games, five NBA Finals, three Stanley Cup Finals, and the US Open. At the 2011 US Open, where Hughes inspired Novak Djokovic to dance on court after his match. Hughes and Djokovic danced again at the 2015 US Open.

As a result of being recognized at the US Open, Hughes performed at Match for Africa, Roger Federer's charity event in Seattle and San Jose. Federer teamed up with Bill Gates and played exhibition matches before playing with John Isner and Jack Sock. Hughes was asked to perform at the Laver Cup in London in September 2022, which was Federer's last match.

He has performed for the NFL, NCAA, NBA and Rugby 7s (Canada, Singapore). He has performed in over 180 minor league arenas and stadiums, including the ECHL, AHL, CHL, UHL, NLL, and C, EIHL, IFL, and EHL.

== Other work ==
Hughes started speaking at high schools across Canada with the "Get Involved" program and then began doing leadership talks for universities and colleges. He has delivered keynote talks for Indeed, Coca-Cola, Caesars Entertainment, Virgin Hotels, Uberflip, Venetian Hotels, and the American Gem Society.

Hughes published a book, King of Cheer – Stories of Showing Up, Getting Up, and Never Giving Up from the World's Most Electrifying Crowd Ignitor on November 10, 2020.

Hughes has done commercials for many companies including DirecTV, and Findlay Chevrolet, a Las Vegas-based car dealership. He was also the voice of the Labatt Radio Blue Campaign.
