= Margaret Hughes (disambiguation) =

Margaret Hughes (c. 1630–1719) was an English actress; mistress of Prince Rupert of the Rhine.

Margaret Hughes may also refer to:

- Margaret Hughes (bowls), lawn bowler from Zambia
- Margaret Hughes (Los Angeles) (1826–1915), first woman member of the Los Angeles City Board of Education
- Margaret Hughes (sportswriter) (1919–2005), English sportswriter
- Margaret Hughes, Miss Australia 1949
- Margaret Hughes, a character in The Wiser Sex
