= Mimi Hughes =

American swimmer

Personal information
- Born: 1955/1956 San Bernardino County, California, United States
- Home town: Taft, Tennessee, United States

Sport
- Sport: Swimming

Mimi Pettersen Hughes (born 1955/56) is an American long-distance swimmer who began her long-distance swims by crossing the Bering Strait. She has since swum the lengths of the rivers of Tennessee, Danube, Drava, and Mura. Mimi dedicates her swims to a variety of causes: understanding between nations (the Bering Strait), environmental awareness (rivers Tennessee, Danube, Drava, and Mura), and lifeskills' training and education for women and girls (Ohio River, 2010).

Declared one of the most important women of the last 100 years by Für Sie magazine, Mimi's philosophy encourages each individual to envision change and then take action.

Hughes wrote her 2013 memoir Wider Than A Mile.
