= Anthony Hughes =

Anthony or Tony Hughes may refer to:

- Anthony Hughes, Lord Hughes of Ombersley (born 1948), British judge
- Anthony Hughes (footballer) (born 1973), English professional footballer
- Charles Anthony Hughes (1890–1967), American actor, sometimes credited as Tony Hughes
- Tony Hughes (actor), Australian actor and singer
- Tony Hughes (American football) (born 1959), American football coach and former player
- Tony Hughes (footballer) (born 1963), Australian rules footballer for Sydney Swans
- Tony Hughes (racing driver) (born 1957), British auto racing driver and businessman
