= Roger Hughes (disambiguation) =

Roger Hughes (born 1960) is an American football coach.

Roger Hughes may also refer to:

- Roger Hughes (priest), English priest
- Roger T. Hughes (1941–2024), Canadian judge
