= Kimberly Hughes =

American biologist

Kimberly A. Hughes is an American biologist. Hughes completed her doctoral studies at the University of Chicago in 1993. She is a professor of biological science at Florida State University. In 2018, Hughes was elected a fellow of the American Association for the Advancement of Science.

Hughes's research focuses on understanding why genetic variation persists. Her lab investigates a variety of topics; life spans, sexual selection, mate choice, and the genetic and social factors that shape growth, behavior, and fitness. They use different organisms, like fruit flies and poecilid fish, along with different techniques for their experiments.
