= Christopher Hughes =

Christopher or Chris Hughes may refer to:

- Chris Hughes (born 1983), American internet entrepreneur; co-founder of Facebook
- Christopher Hughes (diplomat) (1786–1849), American attorney and diplomat
- Christopher Hughes (quiz contestant) (1947–2025), British quiz champion
- Christopher Hughes II, a character on the American television soap opera As the World Turns
- Chris Hughes (hypnotist) (born 1975), British hypnotist, hypnotherapist, speaker and entertainer
- Chris Hughes (footballer) (born 1984), English football midfielder
- Chris Hughes (football manager) (born 1979), Welsh football manager
- Chris Hughes (journalist) (fl. 1990s– ), UK tabloid journalist and author
- Chris Hughes (musician) (born 1954), British musician and record producer; former drummer for the band Adam and the Ants
- Chris Hughes (cyclist), Welsh cyclist
- Chris Hughes (TV personality) (born 1992), British television personality and model
