= Patricia Hughes =

Patricia Hughes may refer to:

- Patricia Hughes (politician), member of Philadelphia City Council
- Patricia Hughes (radio presenter) (1923–2013), British radio continuity announcer and news reader
- Patricia Donoho Hughes (1930–2010), First Lady of Maryland
