= Spencer Hughes =

Spencer Hughes may refer to:

- Spencer Hughes (audio engineer) (1924–1983), electroacoustic engineer, built LS3/5A loudspeakers
- Spencer Leigh Hughes (1858–1920), British engineer, journalist and Liberal politician
