= Edith Hughes =

Edith Hughes may refer to:

- Edith Hughes (architect) (1888–1971), Scottish architect
- Edith Hughes (As the World Turns), fictional character
