= Lord Hughes =

Lord Hughes may refer to:

- William Hughes, Baron Hughes (1911–1999), British Labour Party politician
- Robert Hughes, Baron Hughes of Woodside (born 1932), British Labour Party politician
- Anthony Hughes, Lord Hughes of Ombersley (born 1948), former English judge of the Supreme Court of the United Kingdom
