= Kenneth Hughes =

Kenneth Hughes may be:

- Ken Hughes (1922–2001), British film director, writer, and producer, most famous for writing and directing Chitty Chitty Bang Bang
- Ken Hughes (footballer) (born 1966), Welsh footballer
- Ken Hughes (historian), American presidential historian
- Ken Hughes (politician) (born 1954), Canadian politician
- Kenny Hughes, actor, dancer, director and writer
- Kenny Hughes (rugby league) (born 1990), rugby league footballer
