= Charlotte Hughes =

American author

- Born: 1954 (age 71–72); Williamston, South Carolina, U.S.
- Occupation: Novelist
- Writing career
- Period: 1987–present
- Genre: Romance
- Website: www.readcharlottehughes.com

Charlotte Hughes (born 1954) is an American author of romance and comedy novels, who lives in South Carolina.

== Biography ==
Hughes was born in Williamston, South Carolina; soon after her birth, her family relocated to Texas. While she was a voracious reader as a child, she didn't care for the canonical works. She's said, "In high school and college, I was force-fed a lot of what is considered great literature. I must’ve been a shallow person because I didn’t appreciate it at the time, and I don’t remember most of what I read."

Hughes began her writing career in the early 1980s as the features editor of a small newspaper. She wrote humorous short pieces before venturing into longer works.

== Career ==
Hughes, a New York Times best selling author, has written almost 40 books. These award-winning books run the gamut from romance to mystery, as well as humor, horror and suspense.

Hughes was one of the first category romance writers to secure a top-50 ranking on USA Today's list. A two-time recipient of the Maggie Award, she has also won the Talisman Award for best short story writer.

== Bibliography ==
=== Max Holt (with Janet Evanovich) ===
- 1. Full House (2002)
- 2. Full Tilt (2002)
- 3. Full Speed (2003)
- 4. Full Blast (2004)
- 5. Full Bloom (2005)
- The Full Box (omnibus) (2006)
- 6. Full Scoop (2006)

=== Novels ===
- Too Many Husbands (1986)
- Straight Shootin' (1987)
- Travelin' Man (1988)
- Sweet Misery (1988)
- Tigress (1989)
- Scoundrel (1989)
- Private Eyes (1990)
- Restless Night (1990)
- Louisiana Lovin' (1990)
- Tough Guy, Savvy Lady (1991)
- The Lady and the Cowboy (1991)
- Rascal (1992)
- Island Rogue (1992)
- The Incredible Hunk (1993)
- Kissed by a Rogue (1993)
- The Devil and Miss Goody-Two Shoes (1994)
- Husband Wanted (1995)
- Ready-Made Family (1995)
- Belated Bride (1996)
- Tall, Dark, and Bad (1996)
- Valley of the Shadow (1998)
- Just Married...Again (1998)
- The Last Southern Belle (1998)
- Night Kills (1998)
- New Attitude (2001)
- Hot Shot (2002)
- Millionaire Cop and Mom-To-Be (2002)
- And After That, The Dark (2004)
- See Bride Run! (2014)
- Welcome to Temptation (2015)
- Miss Goody Two-Shoes (2015)

=== Omnibus ===
- Tall, Dark and Cranky / Millionaire Cop

=== Kate Holly Series ===
- What Looks Like Crazy (Feb 2008)
- Nutcase (Feb 2009)
- High Anxiety (Dec 2009)
