= Holly Hughes =

Holly Hughes may refer to:

- Holly Hughes (performance artist) (born 1955), performance artist (half Sri Lankan)
- Holly Hughes (politician) (born 1957), Republican politician from Michigan
