= Joshua Hughes =

Joshua Hughes may refer to:

- Josh Hughes (born 1991), American soccer player
- Joshua Hughes (bishop) (1807–1889), Welsh bishop
- Joshua Pritchard Hughes (1847–1938), British bishop
