= Everett Hughes =

Everett Hughes may refer to:

- Everett Hughes (general) (1885-1957), World War II general and 17th Chief of Ordnance U.S. Army
- Everett Hughes (sociologist) (1897–1983)
