= Mark Hughes (disambiguation) =

Mark Hughes (born 1963) is a Welsh football manager and former international player.

Mark Hughes may also refer to:

== Sports ==
=== Association football (soccer) ===
- Mark Hughes (footballer, born 1962), Welsh football player for Tranmere
- Mark Hughes (footballer, born 1983), Northern Ireland international football player
- Mark Hughes (footballer, born 1986), English football player for Accrington Stanley
- Mark Hughes (footballer, born 1993), Irish footballer

=== Other sports ===
- Mark Hughes (rugby league, born 1954), English-born Australian rugby league footballer
- Mark Hughes (basketball) (born 1966), American basketball player and coach
- Mark Hughes (fighter) (born 1973), American mixed martial arts fighter
- Mark Hughes (rugby league, born 1976), Australian rugby league footballer
- Mark Hughes (journalist), English motorsports journalist
- Mark Hughes (motorsport), British motorsport manager

== Others ==
- Mark Hughes (politician) (1932–1993), British politician; MP for Durham
- Mark R. Hughes (1956–2000), American entrepreneur; founder of Herbalife
- Mark Hughes (Emmerdale), fictional character on the ITV soap opera Emmerdale
