= Russell Hughes =

Russell Hughes may refer to:

- Russell Hughes (American football) (1914–1998), American football coach
- Russell P. Hughes (born 1946), American/British chemist and professor
- Russell S. Hughes (1910–1958), American film screenwriter
- La Meri (Russell Meriwether Hughes, 1899–1988), American ethnic dancer, choreographer, teacher, poet, and scholar
