= Jack Hughes (footballer, born 1912) =

English footballer

Personal information
- Full name: John Henry Hughes
- Date of birth: 25 September 1912
- Place of birth: Oswestry, England
- Date of death: 1991 (aged 78–79)
- Height: 5 ft 8 in (1.73 m)
- Position: Outside right

Senior career*
Years	Team	Apps	(Gls)
- Llangollen Town
1929–1933	Wrexham	79	(15)
1933	Bolton Wanderers	9	(3)
1933–1936	Chester City	82	(21)
1936–1938	Chesterfield	102	(17)
1938	Bradford Park Avenue	3	(0)
- Oswestry Town
- Towyn
- * Club domestic league appearances and goals

John Henry Hughes (25 September 1912 – 1991) was an English professional footballer who played as an outside right. He made over 250 total appearances in the English Football League playing for Wrexham, Bolton Wanderers, Chester, Chesterfield and Bradford Park Avenue.
