= Jamie Hughes =

Jamie Hughes may refer to:

- Jamie Hughes (darts player) (born 1986), English darts player
- Jamie Hughes (footballer) (born 1977), English footballer, the first British footballer to fail a test for a performance-enhancing drug
