= Owen Hughes =

Owen Hughes may refer to:

- Owen Hughes (canoeist) (born 1971), New Zealand slalom canoer
- Owen Hughes (cricketer) (1889–1972), English cricketer and military officer
- Owen Hughes (EastEnders), fictional character
- Owen Hughes (politician) (1848–1932), judge and politician in the Northwest Territories
