= Kim Hughes (disambiguation) =

Kim Hughes (born 1954) is an Australian cricketer.

Kim Hughes may also refer to:

- Kim Hughes (basketball) (1952–2025), American basketball player and coach
- Kim Hughes (broadcaster), Canadian radio personality
- Kim Hughes (GC) (born 1979), British Army bomb disposal expert, recipient of the George Cross
- Kim Sullivan Hughes, fictional character on American soap opera, As the World Turns
