= Admiral Hughes =

Admiral Hughes may refer to:

- Charles Frederick Hughes (1866–1934), U.S. Navy admiral
- Edward Hughes (Royal Navy officer) (c. 1720–1794), British Royal Navy admiral
- Jeffrey W. Hughes (born 1966), U.S. Navy vice admiral
- Sir Richard Hughes, 2nd Baronet (c. 1729–1812), British Royal Navy admiral

== See also ==
- Charles Hughes-Hallett (1898–1985), British Royal Navy vice admiral
- John Hughes-Hallett (1901–1972), British Royal Navy vice admiral
