= Eugene Orlando Hughes =

Eugene Hughes
- Born: Eugene Orlando Hughes; May 5, 1969 (age 57); Dublin, Ireland
- Occupations: Filmmaker and psychotherapist
- Known for: Artgym
- Notable work: The Moving Theatre

Eugene Hughes is an Irish psychologist, psychotherapist, and author whose work explores the relationship between creativity, nature and human development. He is known for developing Environmental Attunement Theory, founding Artgym, and his work on creativity in organisational development.

Hughes has also lectured at universities in the UK and the United States.

== Early life and education ==
Hughes was born in 1969 in Dublin, Ireland. In 1990 he received a bachelor of arts degree from University College Dublin. In 2000, he completed a master's degree in psychology.

In 2009, he completed his master's degree in integrative arts psychotherapy from the Institute of Arts in Therapy and Education. Later, in 2019, he completed his Ph.D. at the University of the Arts, Philadelphia. His Ph.D. research subject was the psychology of being in nature.

== Career ==
Hughes started his career in London in the 1990s before training as a psychologist and psychotherapist. In 2004, he founded and became chief executive of Artgym, an organisation that provides services that promote creativity at work.

In 2010, Hughes established a private clinical psychotherapy practice, working with clients experiencing depression, anxiety, trauma, burnout, and loss of meaning. His clinical work informed his research into creativity, mental health, and human development.

In 2011, he co-founded Lead Like a River, a nature-based leadership programme that combines wilderness immersion with leadership development. The programme has been recognised by The Times as one of the UK's top twenty life-changing experiences and has informed Hughes's research into the psychological effects of nature, later developed in his theory of Environmental Attunement and his book Alone with Nature.

Hughes's research explores the relationship between creativity, aesthetics, nature, and human development. His doctoral research at the University of the Arts, Philadelphia, examined the psychological effects of spending time alone in nature, forming the basis of his theory of Environmental Attunement, which describes a distinct state of consciousness associated with immersive experiences in natural environments. Poltrum, M.; Musalek; Galvin; Saito; Fox (2025). The Oxford Handbook of Mental Health and Contemporary Western. His research has since been developed through academic and professional publications. In Alone with Nature: The Psychology of Environmental Attunement (Bloomsbury Academic, 2026), Hughes expands the theory of Environmental Attunement, examining the psychological processes through which nature influences perception, identity, well-being, and the embodied sense of self.

Hughes has also contributed to the academic literature on aesthetics and mental health. Together with philosopher Arnold Berleant, he co-authored the chapter Aesthetic Engagement as a Pathway to Mental Health and Well-being in The Oxford Handbook of Mental Health and Contemporary Western Aesthetics (Oxford University Press, 2025), examining the relationship between aesthetic experience and psychological well-being.

In The Creative Enterprise: How Human Creativity Can Shape the Future of Work (2025), Hughes applies principles from behavioural psychology and creativity research to organisational development, proposing a model in which collective creativity is central to organisational adaptability, innovation, and long-term performance.

== Selected publications ==
- Alone with Nature: The Psychology of Environmental Attunement (Bloomsbury Academic, 2026)
- Hughes, E. & Berleant, A. Aesthetic Engagement as a Pathway to Mental Health and Well-being. In The Oxford Handbook of Mental Health and Contemporary Western Aesthetics. Oxford University Press (2025)
- The Creative Enterprise: How Human Creativity Can Shape the Future of Work (2025)

== Films ==
In 2016, Hughes directed The Moving Theatre. A documentary using art to share people's migration experiences won several international awards in Asia, Europe, the Middle East, and the US, including Best Documentary at The National Film Awards UK, Indian Independent Film Festival, and London Independent Film Festival.

== Affiliations ==
Hughes is registered with the UK Council for Psychotherapy, the Health Care Professions Council, and the British Association of Art Therapy.
