= Len Hughes =

English footballer

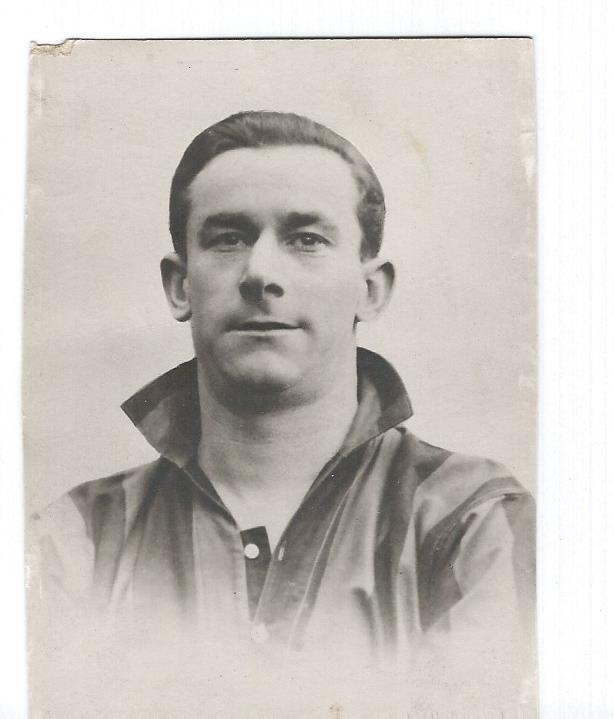

Personal information
- Full name: Leonard Chester Hughes
- Date of birth: 27 February 1899
- Place of birth: Tottenham, England
- Date of death: 19 August 1958 (aged 59)
- Place of death: Tottenham, England
- Position: Wing half

Senior career*
Years	Team	Apps	(Gls)
- Leyton
1924–1926	Burnley	28	(1)
1926–1927	Accrington Stanley	33	(0)
- * Club domestic league appearances and goals

Leonard Chester Hughes (27 February 1899 – 19 August 1958) was an English professional footballer who played as a wing half.

Len Hughes was born on 27 February 1899 at St Loy's Road, Tottenham N17. His father, Thomas Hughes, was a general labourer and his mother was Ellen Hughes.

On 19 July 1915, Hughes started a 5-year apprenticeship to Edmund Henry Matthew of D. Matthew & Son, Tariff Road, Tottenham as a Journeyman Brushmaker. He did not complete the apprenticeship, as he was conscripted into the army in 1917.

Hughes was probably sent to the training battalion of his county regiment for basic military training. In February 1918, he was transferred to the Machine Gun Corps (MGC). After six weeks specialist training and short leave, he was posted overseas in April 1918. In France, he was allocated to joint 24th Battalion MGC, a unit of 800 men fielding 64 Vickers machine guns, which was the machine gun element of the 24th Division.

On 14 May 1918, Hughes was hospitalised in 7th (Canadian) General Hospital at Etaples with PUO, commonly known as trench fever. He was later wounded (believed to be gassed) and was awarded the British War and Victory Medals. He was released from the army on 15 February 1919.

He married Edith Elizabeth Lomax (1900–1982) on 18 September 1921 and they had one child, Winifred Joan Hughes, who died in 1983.

Hughes was an able all-round sportsman and, as a professional footballer, was employed through the 1920s and much of the 1930s, which enabled him to support his family during the depression whilst many others struggled. However, this was at a very modest level and during his time playing for first division Burnley, the family lived in back-to-back millworkers' houses. During the football season, Hughes and his family lived in the town he played for, but during the summer they often returned to Tottenham.

After retiring from professional football, Hughes became a school caretaker and groundsman, working for Rowland Hill School, Tottenham and lived at the cottage in the grounds. A cigarette smoker throughout his life, he contracted lung cancer, which became systemic. He died at the Cottage on 19 August 1958.
