= Senator Hughes =

Senator Hughes may refer to:

== United States Senate members ==
- Charles J. Hughes Jr. (1853–1911), U.S. Senator from Colorado from 1909 to 1911
- Harold Hughes (1922–1996), U.S. Senator from Iowa from 1969 until 1975
- James H. Hughes (1867–1953), U.S. Senator from Delaware from 1937 to 1943
- William Hughes (U.S. senator) (1872–1918), U.S. Senator from New Jersey from 1913 to 1918

== United States state senate members ==
- Bryan Hughes (politician) (born 1969), Texas State Senate
- Calista Cooper Hughes (1914–2004), Nebraska State Senate
- Charles Hughes (representative) (1822–1887), New York State Senate
- Dan Hughes (Nebraska politician) (born 1956), Nebraska State Senate
- Dudley Mays Hughes (1848–1927), Georgia State Senate
- Edward J. Hughes Jr. (fl. 1970s), New Jersey State Senate
- Edward J. Hughes (1888–1944), Illinois State Senate
- Francis Wade Hughes (1817–1885), Pennsylvania State Senate
- Harry Hughes (1926–2019), Maryland State Senate
- Henry Hughes (sociologist) (1829–1862), Mississippi State Senate
- James A. Hughes (1861–1930), West Virginia State Senate
- Jerome M. Hughes (1929–2015), Minnesota State Senate
- Jim Hughes (politician) (born 1964), Ohio State Senate
- John H. Hughes (politician) (1904–1972), New York State Senate
- Mildred Barry Hughes (1902–1995), New Jersey State Senate
- Ralph M. Hughes (born 1948), Maryland State Senate
- Shelley Hughes (born 1958), Alaska State Senate
- Teresa Patterson Hughes (1932–2011), California State Senate
- Vincent Hughes (born 1956), Pennsylvania State Senate
