= Daniel Hughes =

Daniel Hughes may refer to:

- Dan Hughes (basketball) (born 1955), American basketball coach
- Dan Hughes (cyclist), gravel cyclist
- Dan Hughes (Nebraska politician) (born 1956), member of U.S. state legislature
- Daniel Hughes (Australian footballer) (born 1986), Australian rules footballer
- Daniel Hughes (cricketer) (born 1989), Australian cricketer
- Daniel Hughes (Gaelic footballer), Gaelic football player from County Down, Northern Ireland
- Daniel Hughes (politician) (1819–1879), banker, barrister and politician in colonial Victoria
- Daniel Hughes, psychologist who developed Dyadic developmental psychotherapy
- Daniel Hughes (rugby union) (1869–1951), New Zealand international rugby union player
- Daniel Hughes (underground railroad) (1804–1880), conductor on the Underground Railroad
- Daniel Hughes (As the World Turns), a character on American soap opera As the World Turns
- Danny Hughes (born 1963), Australian rules footballer
- Caleb Daniel Hughes
