= James Hughes (footballer, born 1911) =

English footballer

Personal information
- Full name: James Henry Hughes
- Date of birth: 1911
- Place of birth: Cuddington, England
- Position: Centre-half

Senior career*
| Years | Team | Apps | (Gls) |
- Northwich ICI
| 1933–1934 | Birmingham | 0 | (0) |
| 1934–1935 | Bristol City | 10 | (0) |
- * Club domestic league appearances and goals

James Henry Hughes (born 1911, date of death unknown) was an English footballer who played as a centre-half in the Football League for Bristol City.

Hughes was born in Cuddington and played for Northwich ICI before moving to Birmingham in 1933. He spent a season with the club, without making a League appearance. He signed for Bristol City on 8 May 1934 and made ten League appearances in his single season there.
