= Laura Hughes =

Laura Hughes may refer to:

- Laura Hughes (activist) (1886–1966), Canadian feminist
- Laura Hughes (footballer) (born 2001), Welsh footballer
- Laura Hughes (weightlifter) (born 1993), Welsh weightlifter

== See also ==
- Laurie Hughes (1924–2011), English footballer
