= Luke Hughes =

Luke Hughes may refer to:

- Luke Hughes (baseball) (born 1984), Australian baseball player
- Luke Hughes (furniture designer), English furniture designer
- Luke Hughes (ice hockey) (born 2003), American ice hockey player
