= Jane Hughes =

Jane Hughes may refer to:

- Jane Hughes (poet) (1811–1880), Welsh poet and hymnist who wrote under the pen name Deborah Maldwyn
- Jane Hughes (swimmer) (born 1948), Canadian swimmer
- Jane Brereton (1685–1740), née Hughes, Welsh poet who wrote in English
- Jane Fawcett (1921–2016), née Hughes, British codebreaker, singer, and heritage preservationist
