= Kent Hughes =

Kent Hughes may refer to:

- Henry Kent Hughes (c.1814–1880) pastoralist and politician in South Australia
- Wilfrid Kent Hughes (1895–1970), Australian soldier, Olympian and Olympic Games organiser, aka Kent Hughes
- R. Kent Hughes (born 1942), American pastor and author
- Kent Hughes (ice hockey) (born 1970), NHL General Manager
