= Brent Hughes =

Brent Hughes may refer to:

- Brent Hughes (ice hockey, born 1943), NHL player for LA Kings, Philadelphia Flyers, St. Louis Blues, Detroit Red Wings & Kansas City Scouts
- Brent Hughes (ice hockey, born 1966), NHL player for the Winnipeg Jets, Boston Bruins, Buffalo Sabres and New York Islanders
