= Quentin Hughes =

Quentin Hughes may refer to:

- Quentin Hughes (architect) (1920–2004), British SAS officer, architect and academic
- Quentin Hughes (cricketer) (born 1974), English cricketer

== See also ==
- Quintin Hughes
