= Solomon Hughes =

Solomon Hughes may refer to:

- Solomon Hughes (actor) (born 1979), American actor and basketball player
- Solomon Hughes (journalist), British journalist and author
