= Kirsten Hughes =

Kirsten Hughes may refer to:

- Kirsten Hughes (actress) (1962–2022), British actress
- Kirsten Hughes (politician), American lawyer, singer, and politician

== See also ==
- Kristen Hughes (netball) (born 1979), Australian netball player
