= Scott Hughes =

American architect

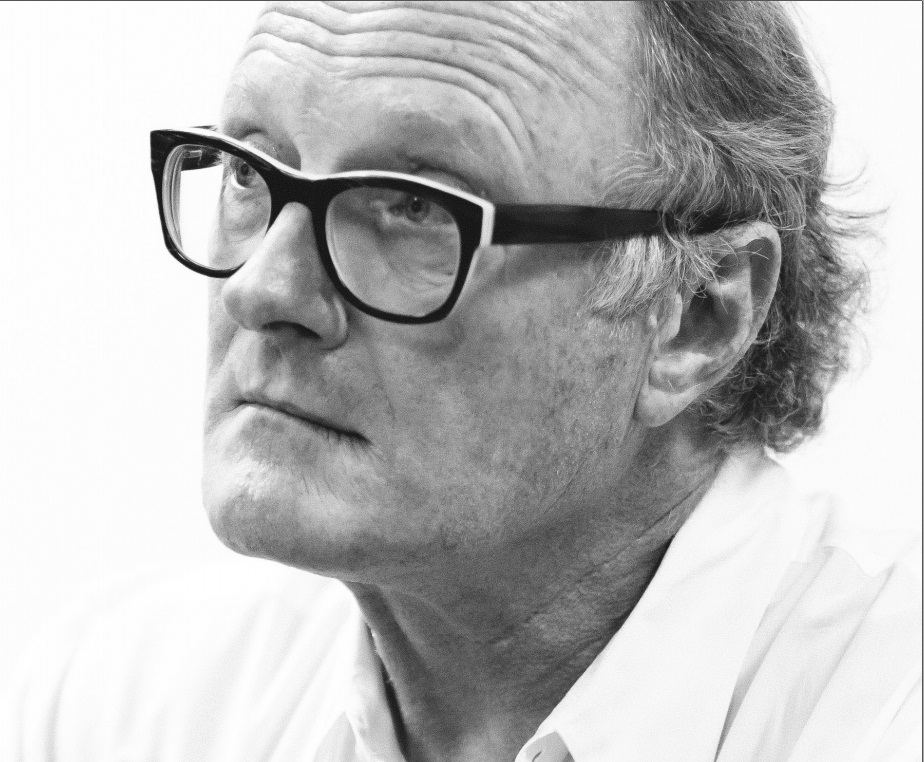
- Years active: 1980–present
- Website: scotthughesarchitect.com huum.com

Scott Hughes is an American architect based in Hobe Sound, Florida. He has been the architect of several high-profile residential, commercial and public projects.

Hughes is the principal of HughesUmbanhowar Architects, a firm he co-founded in 2010. He is most known for designing Beach Road 2, which received global media coverage for its architecture.

== Early life and education ==
Hughes was born in 1952. He began his architectural studies at the University of Virginia and later received a Master of Architecture from the Southern California Institute of Architecture.

== Career ==
In 1981, Hughes established an architecture firm for Vice President Dan Quayle.

Early in his career, he worked at Arthur Cotton Moore Associates. In 1995, following a three-year collaboration with Philip Johnson, he began an 18-month design thesis at The Southern California Institute of Architecture (SCI-Arc) under the direction of the office of Frank Gehry. After completing his thesis, he became a partner at Jones Partners: Architecture, an architecture firm based in California.

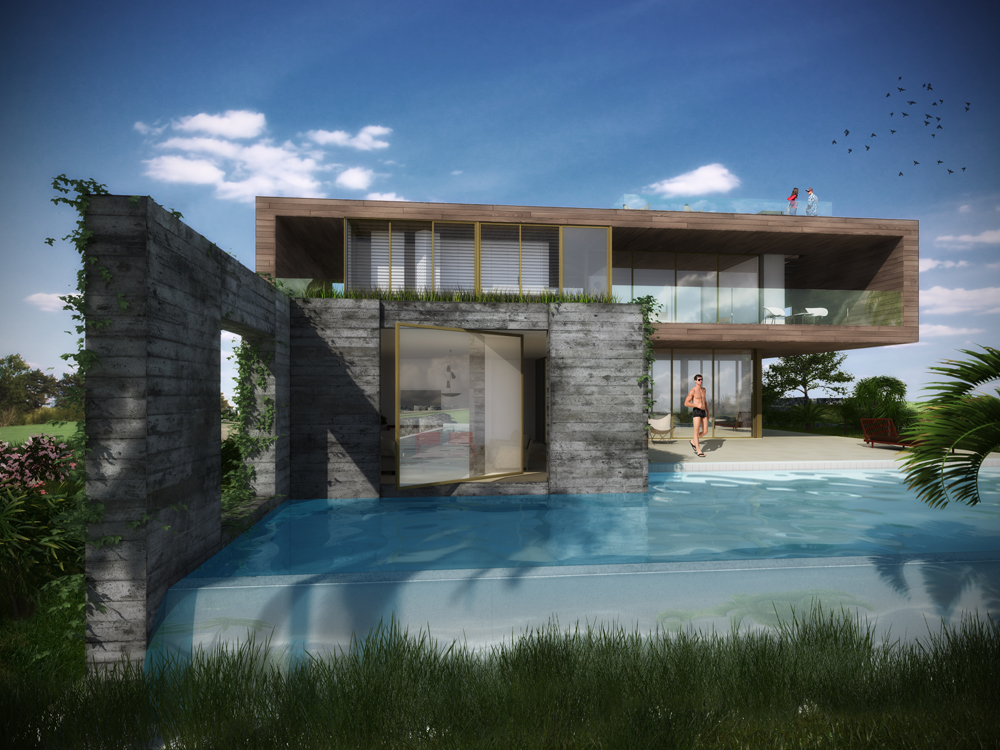
Via Marina Project 2013

In 2004, Hughes became a trustee of Southern California Institute of Architecture. Since 2005 Scott has been appointed to the Local Planning Agency of the Town of Jupiter Island. He founded HughesUmbanhowar Architects (HUUM) with John Umbanhowar in 2010. The firm has studios in Venice California and South Florida. The firm's work has been recognized in a number of exhibitions and publications and has been featured in The Wall Street Journal, The Los Angeles Times, Dwell, Interior Design Magazine, Architectural Record, Architecture, and Progressive Architecture.

The firm's most well known project is called Beach Road 2, a two-story Atlantic beach house built between 2004 and 2005 on the foundation of a previous house in the North Beach Road area of Jupiter Island, Florida. The design was reviewed in multiple magazines and media outlets with The National writing that "...nothing takes fuller advantage of its sweeping Atlantic Ocean views than this Jupiter Island home designed by Scott Hughes and John Umbanhowar..." In 2012, it was recognized as one of the 100 most important Florida Buildings of the last 100 years by the State of Florida.

== Awards and honors ==
- 2015 AIATC Design Merit Award - Big Timber
- 2015 AIATC Design Merit Award - Rohl Residence
- 2011 - AIAFL Masonry Building of the Year - River Road House
- 2009 - AIAFL Design Merit Award - Ski House H2o
- 2008 - AIATC Design Excellence Award - Pine School
- 2005 - AIA/TC Design Excellence Award - Beach Road 2
- 2005 - AIA/TC Design Excellence Award - Paseo Miramar
- 2004 - MSCA Starr Award - Monique L'Huillier, Edina
- 2003 - AIATC Design Merit - Isle Ridge Road
- 2002 - AIALA Int. Arch. Design Award - Monique L'Huillier (with Design Bureau)
- 2002 - AIAFL Design Excellence - Gomez Road
