= Hugh Hughes =

Hugh Hughes may refer to:

== Sports ==
- Hugh Hughes (rugby union), Wales international rugby union player
- Hugh Hesketh Hughes (1902–1940), Welsh polo player

== Others ==
- Hugh Hughes (MP) (died 1609), Welsh politician
- Hugh Hughes (painter) (1790?–1863), Welsh artist, engraver and writer
- Hugh Hughes (poet) (y Bardd Coch) (1693–1776), Welsh poet
- Hugh Hughes (Tegai) (1805–1864), Welsh minister and poet
- Hugh Hughes (trade unionist) (1878–1932), trade unionist in Wales
- Hugh Iorys Hughes (1902–1977), British civil engineer
- Hugh Llewellyn Glyn Hughes (1892–1973), British brigadier, known for liberating Bergen-Belsen concentration camp
- Hugh Price Hughes (1847–1902), Welsh Christian theologian in the Methodist tradition
- Henry Castree Hughes (1893–1976), British architect, known as Hugh Hughes
- Hugh Hughes (One Life to Live), a fictional character from the ABC soap opera One Life to Live
