= Raymond Hughes =

Raymond Hughes may refer to:

- Raymond Hughes (conductor) (born 1952), former director of the Cape Town Philharmonia Choir
- Raymond Hughes (Manitoba politician), Canadian politician
- Raymond Hughes (costume designer) (1937–2015), Emmy-winning costume designer for television and film
- Raymond Davies Hughes (1923–1999), Welsh RAF airman, made propaganda broadcasts in Welsh for the Nazis during World War II
