= Eric Brian Hughes =

American film director

E.B. Hughes
- Born: Somers Point, New Jersey, U.S.
- Occupations: Film director, film producer, screenwriter
- Years active: 1991–present

E.B. Hughes, also known as Eric Brian Hughes, is an American writer, director and producer. He has written, produced and directed three feature films, Turnabout (2016), Exit 0 (2019) and The Long Way Back (2021). His screenplay The Fallen Faithful won Best Screenplay at the 2011 Beverly Hills Film Festival.

== Background ==
Hughes grew up in Ocean City, New Jersey, USA. He attended film school at Temple University in Philadelphia and Columbia College in Hollywood. From 1985-1997, Hughes was a photographer for The Ring.

== Career ==
Hughes' feature film Turnabout (2016) won awards at the Miami International Film Festival and the Philadelphia Independent Film Festival. His screenplay Life's Back Pocket (1991) was a finalist in the Nicholl Fellowships in Screenwriting. His award-winning film Exit 0 was released by Breaking Glass Pictures in March 2020. His film The Long Way Back was released on May 11, 2021 by Breaking Glass Pictures.. His fourth feature film Bloodhound premiered at the 17th annual Soho International Film Festival on October 9th, 2026, where it was nominated for Best US Showcase Feature Film.

== Filmography ==
=== Feature films ===
Year	Films	Credited as		
Year	Films	Director	Writer	Producer
2010	The Fallen Faithful		Yes	
2016	Turnabout	Yes	Yes	Yes
2019	Exit 0	Yes	Yes	Yes
2021	The Long Way Back	Yes	Yes	Yes
2026	Bloodhound	Yes	Yes	Yes
2027	The 30th Floor	Yes	Yes	Yes

=== Short films ===
Year	Films	Credited as		
Year	Films	Director	Writer	Producer
1994	A Distant Chord	Yes	Yes	Yes
1997	Harsh Light	Yes	Yes	Yes
2020	Blood Draw	Yes	No	Yes
2023	Fathom	No	Yes	No

=== Documentary ===
Year	Title	Credited as	
Year	Title	Director	Producer
1991	Once A Champion	Yes	No
