= Nicola Hughes =

Nicola Hughes may refer to:

- Nicola Hughes (actress), English dancer, singer and actress
- Nicola Hughes (policewoman), murdered British police constable
