= Amy Hughes (runner) =

British marathon runner

Personal information
- Nationality: British
- Citizenship: British
- Born: 1987 (age 37–38)
- Occupation(s): Marathon runner Sports therapist

Amy Hughes (born 1987) is a British marathon runner. In 2014-15, Hughes claimed to have completed 53 marathons in 53 days, after which she claimed to have broken the Guinness World Record. However, her record claim was rejected by the organisation, as their requirements at the time asked for claimants to have run the marathons in official races. In 2017, Hughes claimed to have broken the 7 day treadmill world record, by running 521 miles (838 km) over seven days at the Trafford Centre. Her record claim was rejected as implausible for a non-elite runner, and it also lacked independent verification.

== Marathon running ==
=== Background ===
After her friends' child developed a medulloblastoma, Hughes decided that she wanted to break the marathon running record in order to raise money for the Isabelle Lottie Foundation, which "raises awareness about the importance of diagnosing brain tumors early in children". She was also inspired by Larry Macon, who ran across all 50 U.S. states, desiring to run in all the major cities of the United Kingdom. Hughes also wanted to promote "the importance of leading a healthy, active lifestyle".

=== Marathons ===
She started her first run on 6 August 2014, in Chester. From Chester, she travelled from north to south and then to the south-west, before travelling north and completing her 53rd marathon in Manchester on 27 September. Covering a total of 1,400 miles (2,300 km), Hughes travelled to cities including London, Liverpool, Wolverhampton, Newcastle, Glasgow, and Cardiff. After the event, Hughes said her highlight was Brighton, and that Tunbridge Wells was "hilly". During the attempt, Hughes suffered from stomach viruses, one of which caused her to take 8 hours to run her 35th marathon around Taunton.

By claiming to have completed 53 marathons in 53 consecutive days, Hughes declared that she broke the world record for most consecutive marathons; according to the Guinness Book of Records, the current women's record is 60, set by Alice Burch in Southampton, England in 2015, and the previous women's record was 17, set by Parvaneh Moayedi in 2013. (Note: In 2011, Belgian Stefaan Engels was credited as breaking the Guinness record with 365 consecutive marathons.) Hughes also raised over £42,000, of which £10,000 was donated to the Neurosurgery Department at Alder Hey Children's Hospital.

=== Social media reactions ===
Hughes' record attempt received praise on social media, including from some notable celebrities. England football captain Wayne Rooney described her efforts as "a great achievement", whilst Paula Radcliffe tweeted her support for the "amazing and inspirational accomplishment".

== Treadmill running ==
In 2017, Hughes claimed to have broken the 7-day treadmill world record, by running 521 miles (838 km) over seven days at the Trafford Centre, more than the previous record of 517.63 miles (833.04 km). Her claim was rejected by Guinness, was subsequently heavily scrutinised and met with scepticism by some in the running community, in particular on Let's Run's forum, and the Ultrarunning Community Facebook group. Criticism was largely focused on the lack of any verifiable data to support this or any previous record claims, limited evidence to suggest the requisite athletic pedigree to break a record previously held by elite runners, and video evidence of Hughes taking breaks whilst the treadmill continued to run. Her record claim had no independent witnesses, with the only witness being her ex-partner.

A subsequent investigation website concluded that "As a result of her treadmill record being denied, people have questioned her ability. 520 miles on a treadmill in 7 days would require an ability on par with the elite ultra runners and multi-day runners. While she will not be able to have this record validated, there are many sanctioned multi-day races – or even 24-hour races where she could at least validate her abilities. To date, none of her official races stand out. She admits that she is not fast, but she can prove her stamina in any # of sanctioned events".

== Other activities ==
After completing the marathons, Hughes was involved in a number of high-profile events. She helped Blue Peter presenter Lindsey Russell train for the London Marathon, and has spoken at many Running Expos. Her record won the "best running moment of the year" at the 2015 Running Awards.

== Personal life ==
Hughes works as a sports therapist in Oswestry, Shropshire.
