= Roy Hughes =

Roy Hughes may refer to:

- Roy Hughes, Baron Islwyn (1925–2003), British Labour Party politician and union organiser, MP for Newport 1966–1983, for Newport East 1983–1997
- Roy Hughes (baseball) (1911–1995), American professional baseball player, played in the Major Leagues 1935-46
- Roy Hughes (footballer), (born 1949), English footballer
- Roy Hughes (bridge) (born 1954), champion contract bridge player and author
