= Iain Hughes =

British Circuit judge (born 1950)

Iain Hughes (born 7 December 1950) is a British circuit judge.

He was educated at Moseley Hall Grammar School, the University of Bristol (LLB) and King's College London (MA war studies, 2011). He was called to the bar at Inner Temple in 1974 and was a recorder from 2000 to 2002.
