= Isaac Hughes =

Isaac Hughes may refer to:

- Isaac Hughes (missionary) (1798–1870), British Calvinist missionary and preacher
- Isaac F. Hughes (1861–1931), Los Angeles businessman and political figure
- Isaac Hughes (footballer) (born 2004), English-born, New Zealand footballer
