= Lawrence Hughes =

Lawrence Hughes may refer to:

- Lawrence Hughes (actor), American actor in 1922 film The Altar Stairs
- Ronald Lawrence Hughes (1920–2003), Australian army officer
- Laurie Hughes (1924–2011), English footballer, played in 1950 World Cup
- Larry Hughes (politician) (1931–2000), American politician in Ohio
- Lawrence Hughes (golf course designer), designer of Thunderbird Country Club golf course
- Lawrence Hughes, unsuccessful candidate in 1980 Northern Territory general election in Australia
- Lawrence D. Hughes, racehorse trainer in 1991 Bourbonette Oaks
- Lawrence Hughes, Canadian businessman, founder of CipherTrust
- Lawrence Hughes, American boxer who lost 2014 to Joachim Alcine

== See also ==
- Lawrence E. Hughes Memorial Highway in Ohio State Route 315
