= Stuart Hughes (disambiguation) =

Stuart Hughes (born 1959) is a Canadian actor.

Stuart Hughes is also the name of:

- Stuart Hughes (politician), British politician in the Official Monster Raving Loony Party
- H. Stuart Hughes (1916–1999), American academic
