= Ben D. Hughes =

American politician (1878–1947)

1945 portrait of Hughes

Ben D. Hughes (October 24, 1878 – April 4, 1947) was an American farmer and politician.

Hughes was born in Iowa and moved to Minnesota in 1888. He lived in New Ulm, Blue Earth County, Minnesota, and was a farmer. Hughes served on the Blue Earth County Commission. He also served on the Cambria Township Board, as the Cambria Township Assessor and also served on the Cambria Township School Board. Hughes served in the Minnesota House of Representatives from 1941 until he died in 1947.
