= Gregory Hughes =

Gregory or Greg Hughes may refer to:

- Greg Hughes (born 1969), American politician from Utah
- Greg Hughes (Gaelic footballer) (1939–2014), Irish Gaelic footballer
- Gregory Hughes (triple jumper) (born 1979), triple jumper from Barbados, silver medalist at the 2003 Central American and Caribbean Championships in Athletics
- Gregory Hughes (writer), British writer

== See also ==
- Gregg Hughes (born 1963), American talk radio broadcaster
