= Griffith William Hughes =

Welsh accountant and musician

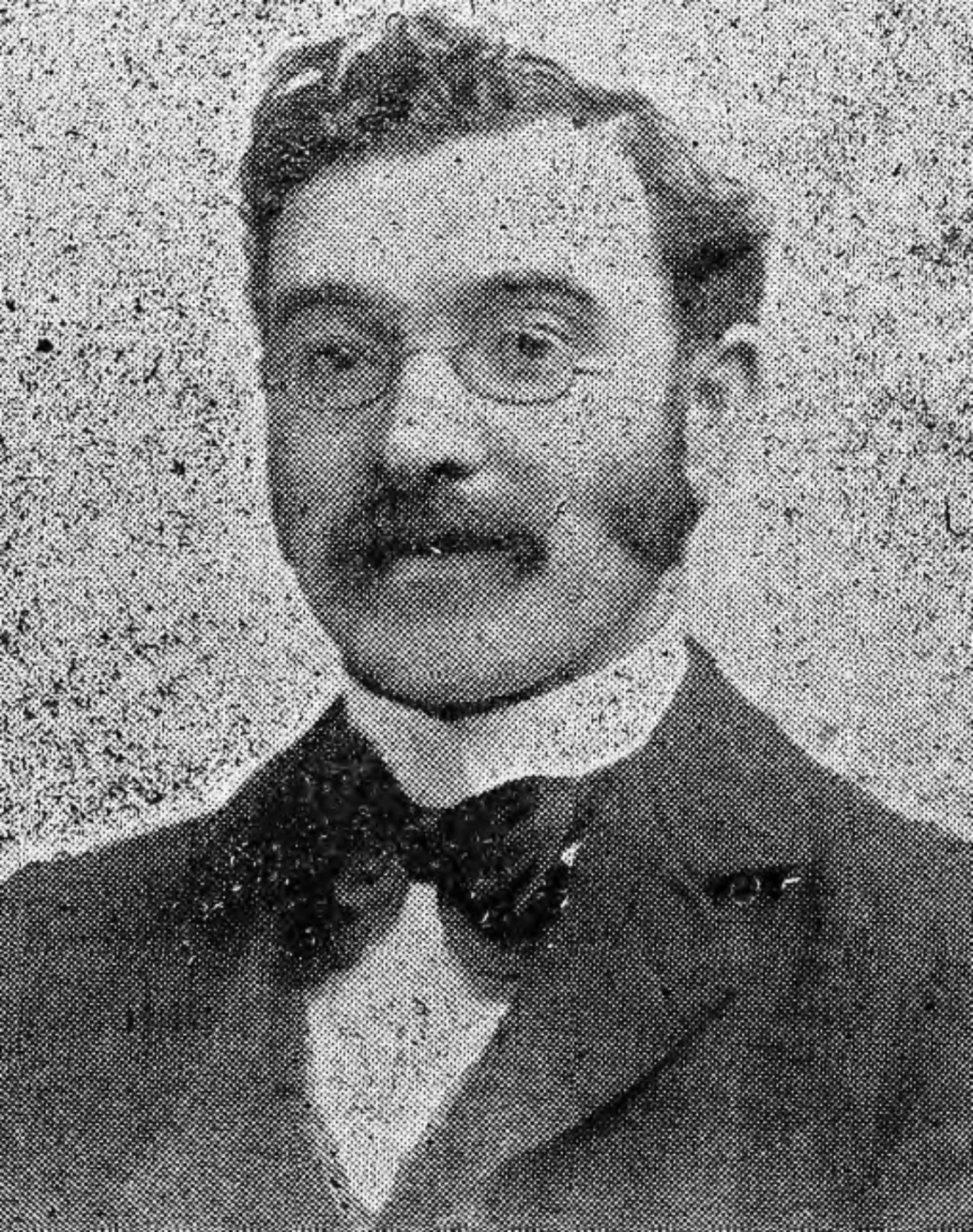
- Born: 22 February 1861; Cefn Mawr
- Died: 27 September 1941 (aged 80)

Griffith William Hughes (22 February 1861 - 27 September 1941) was a Welsh accountant and musician.

Hughes was the son of Ann and Griffith Hughes, born in the North Wales village Cefn Mawr, Denbighshire. In his early years, he took part in musical classes managed by J.O. Jones, Pen-y-cae and Edward Hughes. Hughes attended his local primary school and soon went on to attend Ruabon grammar school before working as a clerk in the office of the Wynnstay Colliery Company. Soon after, he would become the conductor of both Cefn Mawr choral society, which consisted of around 100 voices, and the male voice choir in 1889. Simultaneously, Hughes was a precentor at Capel Mawr, Rhosllannerchrugog, for a short while. G.W.Hughes studied the Tonic Sol-fa System before gaining a degree in this subject, it was then in 1900 in which he was elected to the Council of the Tonic Sol-fa College. Before moving to Prestatyn in 1926 upon his retirement, G.W.Hughes was chosen to be a stipendiary precentor at Princes Road Welsh Capel Mawr Chapel, Liverpool, in 1911. G.W.Hughes fashioned many anthems, hymns and tunes, he also directed Cymanfaoedd Cymru, and in 1929, after his retirement, succeeded in becoming one of the editors of Llyfr Emynau a Thonau y Methodistiaid Calfinaidd a Wesleaidd. Hughes died on the 27th of September 1941, aged 80, and was buried in the Cemetery in Prestatyn.
