= Justin Hughes =

Justin Hughes may refer to:

- Justin Hughes (law professor), professor of law specializing in intellectual property law
- Justin Hughes (soccer) (born 1985), American soccer player
