= Hughes baronets =

Set index for Hughes baronets

There have been two baronetcies created for persons with the surname Hughes, one in the Baronetage of Great Britain and one in the Baronetage of the United Kingdom. One creation is extant as of 2026.

- Hughes baronets of East Bergholt (1773)
- Hughes baronets of Denford (1942): see Sir Harrison Hughes, 1st Baronet (1881–1958)

== See also ==
- Hughes-Hunter baronets
- Hughes-Morgan baronets
