= Simon Hughes (disambiguation) =

Simon Hughes (born 1951) is a British politician.

Simon Hughes may also refer to:

- Simon Hughes (cricketer) (born 1959), English cricketer and journalist
- Simon P. Hughes Jr. (1830–1906), governor of Arkansas
