= Philip Hughes =

Philip, Phillip, or Phil Hughes may refer to:

- Phillip Hughes (1988–2014), Australian cricketer
- Phil Hughes (baseball) (born 1986), American baseball player
- Phil Hughes (English cricketer) (born 1991), English cricketer
- Phil Hughes (footballer) (born 1964), Northern Irish football player
- Philip Hughes (footballer, born 1981), Irish football player
- Philip Hughes (historian) (1895–1967), Roman Catholic priest and historian
- Philip Edgcumbe Hughes (1915–1990), Anglican clergyman and New Testament scholar
- Philip Joseph Hughes Jr. (born c. 1948), convicted American serial killer
- G. Philip Hughes (born 1953), American diplomat
