= Glyn Hughes =

Glyn Hughes is the name of:

- Glyn Hughes (British Army) (1892–1973), senior British Army officer
- Glyn Hughes (footballer) (1931–1995), Welsh footballer
- Glyn Tegai Hughes (1923–2017), Welsh scholar, writer and literary critic
- Glyn Hughes (writer) (1935–2011), English poet, artist and novelist
- Glyn Hughes (rugby union) (active 2015), rugby player transferring from Wasps to Moseley in 2015–16
- Glyn Hughes (sculptor) (active 2001), sculptor of the Alan Turing Memorial in Manchester, England
