= Stephen Hughes =

Stephen Hughes may refer to:

- Stephen Hughes (footballer, born 1919) (1919–1981), English football defender, played for clubs including Liverpool, Oldham Athletic and New Brighton
- Stephen Hughes (footballer, born 1976), English football midfielder, played for clubs including Arsenal, Coventry City and Walsall
- Stephen Hughes (footballer, born 1982), Scotland international footballer, played for Rangers, Leicester City, Motherwell, Norwich City
- Stephen Hughes (footballer, born 1984), English football midfielder, played for Brentford and several non-League clubs
- Stephen Hughes (politician) (born 1952), British MEP for North East England
- Steve Hughes (born 1966), Australian musician and comedian
- Steven Hughes (1954–2000), American artist

== See also ==
- Stephen Rahman-Hughes (born 1970), English-Malaysian actor and singer
