= Connor Hughes =

Connor Hughes may refer to:

- Connor Hughes (American football) (born 1983), American football placekicker
- Connor Hughes (footballer) (born 1993), English football player
