= Tyler Hughes =

Tyler Hughes may refer to:

- Tyler Hughes (soccer) (born 1980), Canadian soccer player
- Tyler Hughes (American football coach), American football coach
- Tyler Hughes (quarterback) (born 2003), American football quarterback
- Tyler Hughes, basketball player, see 2010 NBA Development League draft
- Tyler Hughes, racing driver at 2015 NASCAR K&N Pro Series East
