= Mollie Hughes =

British mountaineer and sports adventurer (born 1990)

Personal information
- Born: 3 July 1990 (age 35) Torbay, Devon, England

Mollie Hughes (born 3 July 1990) is a British mountaineer and sports adventurer who in 2017 broke the world record for becoming the youngest woman to climb both sides of Mount Everest, and in 2020 became the youngest woman to ski solo to the South Pole.

== Early life ==
Mollie Hughes was born on 3 July 1990 and grew up in Torbay in Devon.

She studied psychology and sports biology at the University of the West of England, in Bristol. For her final year project, she decided to investigate the psychological experience of climbing Mount Everest, interviewing seven male climbers who had all reached the summit. Hughes explored their motivation, their ability to control fear, the psychological pressures they faced, and their experience of reaching the summit.

== Everest expeditions ==
In 2012, Hughes joined an expedition to climb Mount Everest from the South side of the mountain (via Nepal). She reached the summit on 19 May 2012. She was accompanied by her friend and guide Lhakpa Wongchu Sherpa who is from Pangboche in the Solukhumbu. In 2017, Hughes climbed Mount Everest from the North side. Accompanied again by Lhakpa Wongchu Sherpa, British mountain guide Jon Gupta, and Lila Tamang. They reached the summit on 16 May 2017, and Hughes became the youngest woman to summit Everest from both the North and South sides at the age of 26.

== Antarctician experiences ==
In 2020, Mollie Hughes became the youngest woman to ski to the South Pole Solo. The expedition was funded through sponsorship from Gore-Tex, ATAG, and a private donor using the trip as a fundraiser for Cancer Research UK. Hughes left Hercules Inlet on 13 November 2019 and reached the pole on 10 January the following year. She skied 702 miles (1,130 km) alone while pulling a 105-kilogram sled named Boudicca. She had originally hoped to reach the pole on New Year's Day but was delayed by bad weather, with temperatures approaching −45 degrees Celsius with windchill and 30-knot winds. During the journey, whiteout prevented visibility for eight days. After returning from the pole, she recuperated in Chile before returning to Britain.

== Motivational speaking ==
Hughes began talking to schools and corporate groups following her return from Everest in 2012. Since then, she has delivered motivational talks to over 50,000 schoolchildren in the UK, and well-known businesses including Santander, Sky, and Baillie Gifford. In 2018 Hughes delivered a TEDx talk on "Unlocking Your Resilience" that can be viewed on YouTube.

== Other achievements ==
On 1 December 2020, Mollie Hughes was appointed the first female president of Scouts Scotland.
