= Robin Hughes =

Robin or Robyn Hughes may refer to:

- Robin Hughes (actor) (1920–1989), British actor
- Robin Hughes (filmmaker), Australian filmmaker
- Robyn Hughes, New Zealand politician
