= Archie Hughes =

Archie Hughes may refer to:

- Archie Hughes (footballer, born 1871), Scottish footballer
- Archie Hughes (footballer, born 1885), Scottish footballer see List of Bury F.C. players (1–24 appearances)
- Archie Hughes (footballer, born 1919) (1919–1992), Welsh footballer
- Archie Hughes (rugby union) (born 2003), Welsh rugby union player
