= Colin Hughes (microbiologist) =

British microbiologist (born 1953)

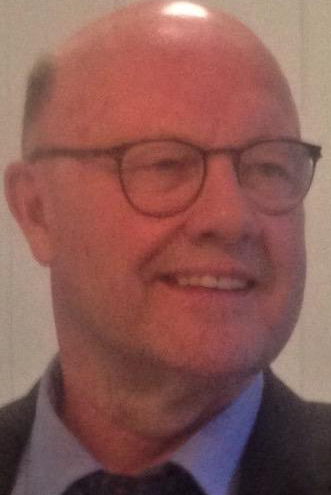
Hughes in 2019

Colin Hughes PhD ScD FLSW (born 14 March 1953) is a British microbiologist who has worked in the areas of bacterial virulence, motility and antibiotic resistance. He is Emeritus Professor of Microbiology at the University of Cambridge, Fellow of Trinity College Cambridge, and Fellow of the Learned Society of Wales.

== Early life and education ==
Hughes was born and raised in North Wales. His parents were May Hughes (née Roberts) and Joseph Hughes, a textile worker. He was educated at Holywell Grammar School, which during his time there changed to the comprehensive school Holywell High School. He studied Natural Sciences at the University of Kent, Canterbury (1971–74), where, from 1974 to 1977, he also undertook research on plasmid-bearing enterobacteria for a PhD under the supervision of Professor G.G.Meynell.

== Academic career ==
He trained in three post-doctoral posts: at the Sandoz Research Institute Vienna (1977–80), at the University of Würzburg with Professor Werner Goebel (1980–83), and at the Smith Kline Research Institute in Philadelphia (1884). In 1985, he became Lecturer in Microbiology at the University of Cambridge Department of Pathology where he established research into the molecular biology of pathogenic bacteria. His subsequent work focused on cellular mechanisms underlying toxin biogenesis and export, flagellum assembly and multidrug resistance. He has published over 120 research articles, listed on Google Scholar.

He was awarded a Readership in Microbiology in 1996 and in 2001 was promoted to Professor of Microbiology. In 2000 he received the Doctor of Science degree from the University of Cambridge. He was elected Fellow of Trinity College, Cambridge in 1997, and in 2012 he became Fellow of the Learned Society of Wales (FLSW).

From 1985 to 2018, Hughes taught the University's Natural, Medical and Veterinary Science students in the Department of Pathology, where he became Director of Teaching (2011–17), and he was Director of Studies in Medical Sciences at Trinity College, Cambridge from 1997 to 2017. He was Head of the Department of Pathology's Division of Microbiology and Parasitology from 1998 to 2017, and Deputy Head of the Department from 2011 to 2017.
