= Gerry Hughes =

Gerry Hughes may refer to:

- Gerry Hughes (camogie), former camogie player
- Gerry Hughes (sailor), first profoundly deaf man to sail single-handed across the Atlantic Ocean
