= Jay Hughes (disambiguation) =

Jay Hughes may refer to:

- Jay Hughes (1874–1924), American baseball pitcher
- Jay Hughes (American football) (born 1991), American college football player
- Jay Hughes (politician) (born 1963), American Democratic politician
