= Dusty Hughes =

Dusty Hughes may refer to:

- Dusty Hughes (baseball) (born 1982), American baseball player
- Dusty Hughes (playwright) (born 1947), British dramatist
