= Babette Hughes =

American dramatist (1905–1982)

Babette Hughes (1905–1982) was an American playwright of one-act plays and mystery novelist. She was born in Seattle, Washington and while an English student at the University of Washington she met the American playwright Glenn Hughes, whom she married in 1924. Hughes wrote comedic one-act plays, mysteries, and non-fiction works.

== Personal life ==
She was born Helen Babette Plechner in Seattle, Washington on December 28, 1905. In 1923, while an English student at the University of Washington she met the American playwright Glenn Hughes, who had joined the university as an assistant professor of drama in 1919. Secretly married in 1924, they were together for around 20 years. After their divorce in 1944 or 1946, she relocated from Seattle to New York City and married Benn Hall, a public relations executive. Her daughter Mary Anne remained in Seattle, and she returned to Seattle several times to visit. Once Hall died, Hughes took over his public relations firm.

== Plays ==
Hughes frequently wrote comedic one-act plays, particularly in the subgenre of 10-minute plays. Her writing was reviewed positively, and she was known for her sophisticated characters. As well as writing her own plays, she worked with her husband to translate other monologues and plays from French into English.

She wrote more than 20 plays, including:

- March Heir (1925)
- No More Americans (1925)
- Three Players, a Fop and a Duchess (1925)
- One Egg (1926)
- Bound for Mexico (1926)
- Money for Jam (1928)
- Backstage (1929)
- Columbine in the Country (1930)
- Murderer! Murderer! Murderer! (1931)
- Please Do Not Pick the Flowers (1931)
- Safety Pins First (1932)
- The First White Woman (1932)
- Too Many Cakes (1934)
- Fit as a Fiddle (1936)
- Daisy Won't Tell (1937)
- If the Shoe Pinches (1937)
- Mrs Harper's Bazaar (1937)
- Early Victorian (1938)
- Greek to You (1938)
- Spring Scene (1939)
- Because It's June (1940)
- The Lady Who Came to Lunch (1942)
- Life with Mother (1942)
- Sisters Under the Skin (1949)

The Oakland Tribune called her play One Egg "a rather clever farce". In 1936, she was published in a collection of One-Act plays in a 2 volume collection, The One Act Theater, along with Ethel van der Veer and her husband, Glen Hughes and published by Samuel French, Inc. Her 1937 one-act-play If the Shoe Pinches was published in the 1938 anthology The Best One-Act Plays of 1937, which features work by "the best-known playwrights". If the Shoe Pinches was performed in 1938 with blind actresses performing the six roles.

== Other works ==
Another of Hughes' earliest works was Christopher Morley, multi ex uno (University of Washington chapbooks, no. 12, 1928), a work based on the life and personality of American poet and novelist Christopher Morley. It was published as part a series of chapbooks developed by her husband at the University of Washington. Hughes presents different aspects of Morley as different characters in the book, which was reviewed positively in the Oakland Tribune in 1928.

She wrote two mysteries about a fictional detective from Stanford University, Murder in the Zoo in 1932 and Murder in Church in 1934. In May 1935, she wrote a fictional ending to the actual George Weyerhaeuser kidnapping in a piece for the Seattle Daily Times, in which the poet Egbert Lobe rescues the nine-year-old boy.

Hughes' 1946 semi-autobiographical novel Last Night When We Were Young features a character named Julie who experiences similar things to the author. Kenneth Horan, writing for the Chicago Tribune on February 22, 1948, said in a review of the book, "There is sufficient talent in Miss Hughes' charming head to write any number of novels. But she seems to be in a hurry. She glosses over incidents with the wide broad sweep of a scythe, and she rushes headlong into the great moments of reconciliation or regret or accomplishment, without waiting to explain. But her writing has a quality of entertainment and for that, all else is forgiven". The book was followed the next year by Magic Penny, which was also about a playwright in a relationship with a much younger woman.

She also wrote a non-fiction book based on her work in public relations, The right angles; how to do successful publicity (New York: Ives Washburn, 1965).
