= Albert Hughes (disambiguation) =

Albert Hughes is a filmmaker.

Albert Hughes may also refer to:

- Albert Hughes (bishop) (1878–1954)
- Albert Hughes (ice hockey) (1899–1969)
