= Ann Hughes =

Ann or Anne Hughes may refer to:

- Anne Hughes (politician) (born 1965), American politician from Connecticut
- Ann Hughes (judoka) (born 1960), British judoka
- Anne Hughes (art patron) (1944–2021), American gallery owner, restaurateur and patron of the arts
- Ann Hughes (politician) (born 1943), American politician from Illinois
- Ann Harriet Hughes (1852–1910), Welsh language novelist
- Anne Hughes (diarist), author of The Diary of a Farmer's Wife 1796–1797 (also known as Anne Hughes' Diary)
- Anne Rice Hughes (fl. 1784-1795), British author
- Anne Penny (1729–1784), née Hughes, British poet and translator
