= Jeff Hughes =

Jeff Hughes may refer to:

- Jeff Hughes (fighter) (born 1988), American mixed martial artist
- Jeff Hughes (footballer) (born 1985), Northern Irish footballer
- Jeff Hughes (historian) (1965–2018), British historian of science
- Jeff Hughes (musician), American traditional jazz cornet player
- Jeff Hughes (soccer) (born 1984), American soccer player
