= Freddie Hughes =

American gospel singer-songwriter (1943–2022)

Fred Willie Hughes Jr. (August 20, 1943 – January 18, 2022) was an American gospel, soul, and R&B singer, perhaps best known for his 1968 song, "Send My Baby Back".

Hughes was born in Berkeley, California in 1943, and grew up in Oakland, California. As a singer, he began working professionally in vocal groups from Oakland in the mid-1950s. In his teens, he sang at the Ephesian Church of God in Christ in Berkeley.

The song "Send My Baby Back" (released through Wand Records) was written by Lonnie Hewitt and Ernest Marbray, and issued as a single in 1968, with "Where's My Baby" on the B-side. The single appeared on the U.S. Billboard R&B chart, peaking at No. 20 that year. It also charted on the Billboard Hot 100 peaking at No. 94.

In 1969, "Send My Baby Back" was recorded by jazz trumpeter Don Ellis, and appeared on his album The New Don Ellis Band Goes Underground.

"Send My Baby Back" was Hughes' only chart success, but he remained active and performed in numerous clubs right until his death.

In early January 2022, Hughes was hospitalized with pneumonia and COVID-19. He died on January 18, 2022, at age 78, from leukemia and COVID-19 complications at Kaiser Oakland Medical Center in Oakland, California.
