= Alan Hughes =

Alan Hughes may refer to:

- Alan Hughes (cricketer) (born 1951), Irish cricketer
- Alan Hughes (footballer) (born 1948), English footballer
- Alan Hughes (presenter) (born 1963), Irish television presenter

== See also ==
- Allen Hughes (disambiguation)
