= Edwin Sawle Hughes =

Australian auctioneer & naturalist (1850-1926)

Edwin Sawle Hughes (26 February 1850 – 22 October 1926), commonly referred to as E. S. Hughes, was a auctioneer and naturalist in South Australia. He was prominent in the Literary Societies movement of the late 19th- and early 20th-centuries.

== History ==
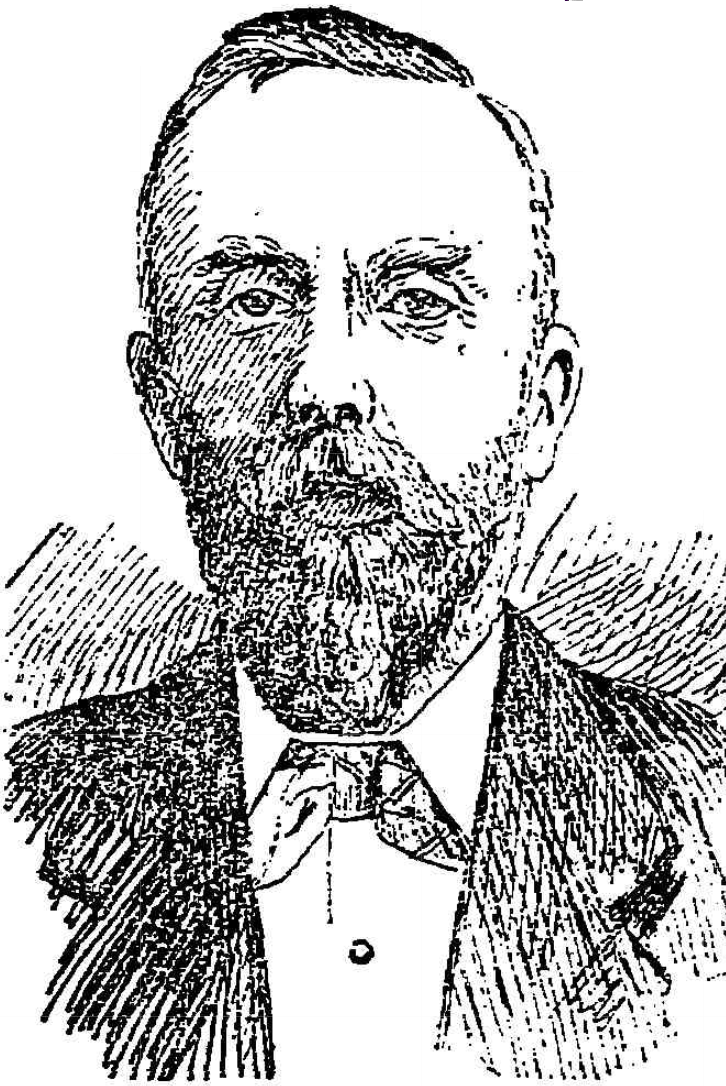
E. S. Hughes

Hughes was born in North Adelaide, a son of Town Clerk William Alexander Hughes (died 1892). He was educated at Whinham's school and at J. L. Young's Adelaide Educational Institution, and on leaving was employed in the South Australian Treasury. 18 months later he started working for Daniel Wilkie Melvin, a King William Street auctioneer, leaving to establish his own business as auctioneer and valuer at the Federal Mart, Grenfell Street.

== Interests ==
Hughes was

- elected councillor for Young Ward for the Adelaide City Council in 1893, when opposing candidates included Alexander Dowie. and lost his seat in 1895, perhaps due to another candidate having the same surname, but his record of service was praised.
- a longtime member of the Literary Society and founder of its Union Parliament
- a member of the University Shakespeare Society and the Poetry Society
- a member of the Field Naturalists section of the Royal Society and its chairman in 1925
- a Justice of the Peace
- president in 1897 and 1899, and treasurer of the Adelaide branch of the Australian Natives' Association
- a foundation member of Adelaide's Y.M.C.A.

== Family ==
Hughes married Wilhelmina Melvin Whiting (1852–1931) (Note: Wilhelmina was one of D. W. Melvin's nieces (daughter of Melvin's sister Isabella (1826–1915))) on 10 August 1875. They had two sons:

- Rupert St John Hughes (born 1876) of Melbourne
- Edwin Kenneth Hughes (born 1881) of Unley

His brother William Alexander Hughes (1855–1943) was a prize-winning student at AEI, Adelaide manager of South British Insurance Co. Ltd.
