= Sir Harrison Hughes, 1st Baronet =

Sir Thomas Harrison Hughes, 1st Baronet (13 April 1881 – 31 October 1958) was a British businessman and public servant.

Educated at Rugby School, Hughes joined Thomas and James Harrison, shipowners, of Liverpool, eventually becoming senior partner. He was a director of the Suez Canal Company from 1920, and vice-president from 1932.

During the Second World War, Hughes served as Director of Liner Division, Ministry of War Transport, from 1939 to 1942. He was created a baronet in 1942.
