= Denny Hughes =

American football player (1894–1953)

Profile
- Position: Center

Personal information
- Born: April 6, 1894
- Died: November 9, 1953 (aged 59)
- Listed height: 5 ft 11 in (1.80 m)
- Listed weight: 185 lb (84 kg)

Career information
- College: George Washington University

Career history
- Pottsville Maroons (1925)
- Stats at Pro Football Reference

Dennis Hughes (1894–1953) was a professional football player who played during the early years of the National Football League (NFL). A graduate of George Washington University, Hughes made his NFL debut in 1925 with the Pottsville Maroons, where he helped the Maroons win the NFL Championship, before it was stripped from the team due to a disputed rules violation. He played for the Pottsville Maroons for his entire career.
