= Kate Duval Hughes =

American author and inventor

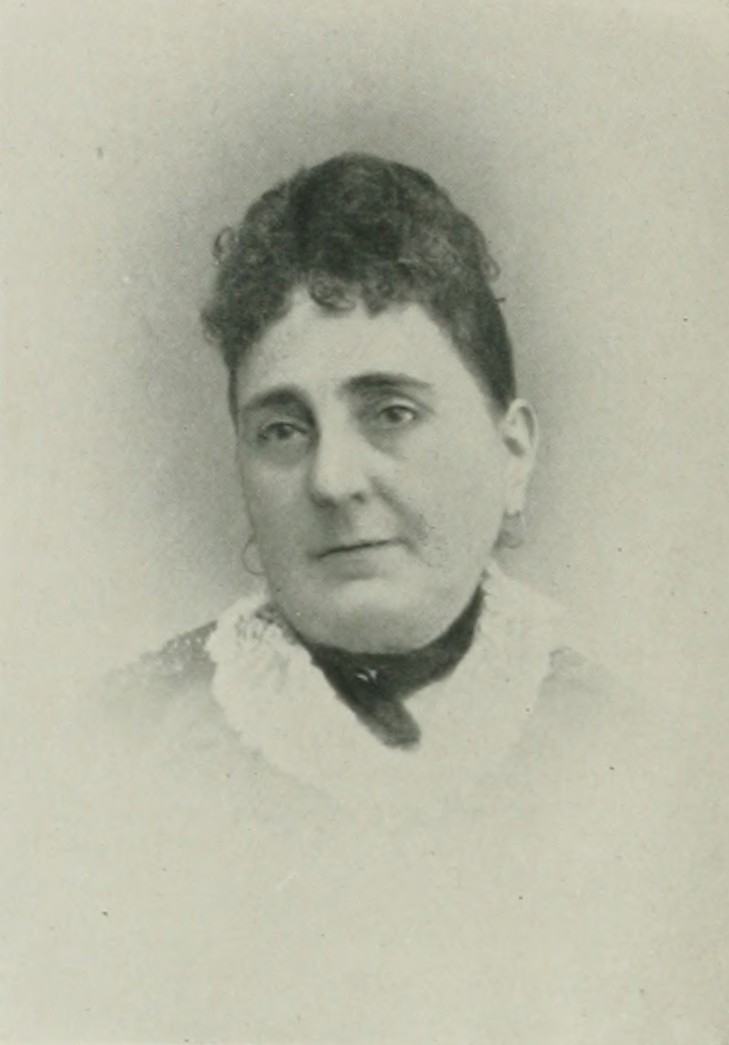
- Hughes, circa mid-late 1800s
- Born: June 15, 1837; Philadelphia, Pennsylvania
- Occupations: Author, inventor
- Known for: Inventions and children's books

Kate Duval Hughes (born June 15, 1837) was an American author and inventor of two window-sash-security devices.

== Early life and family ==
Hughes was born in Philadelphia, Pennsylvania on June 15, 1837. Her father, French-born Peter Stephen Duval, owned a large lithographic firm in Philadelphia. Her brother was Stephen C. Duval.

She married, but the marriage ended in divorce. At the same, the family fortune was lost. She then spent several years in Europe before moving to Washington, D. C. where she took a job with a federal agency. She never remarried and instead concentrated on her career, her inventions and her writing.

== Career ==
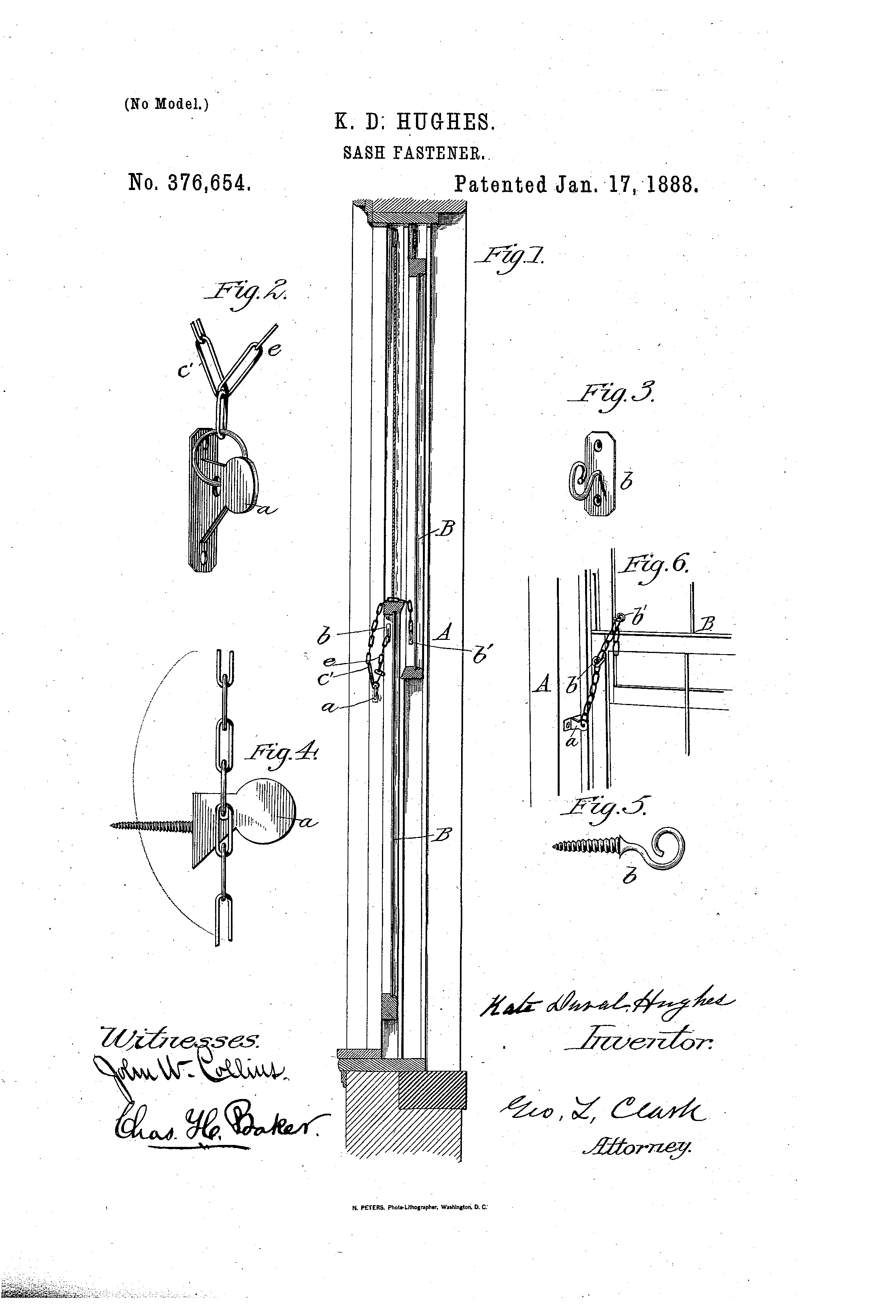
Kate Duval Hughes, US Patent No, 376654 A

Hughes invented two Combined Window Sash Fasteners and Holders, receiving patents on both of them. Using her inventions, a home owner could lower and raise the upper and lower sashes of their windows to a limited extent, increasing home security.

In 1890, Hughes discovered how to extract the essential oil of frankincense. She incorporated this oil into an ointment for skin diseases, which was used in many hospitals.

== Writings ==
Hughes wrote four books for younger readers: Little Pearls (New York, 1876), The Mysterious Castle (Baltimore, 1878), The Fair Maid of Connaught (New York, 1889) and Legends and Tales of the Sierras (1888).

A devout Roman Catholic, Hughes' books had religious themes. Cardinal James Gibbons praised her works.
