= Mathew Hughes =

English Victoria Cross recipient (1822–1882)

Matthew Hughes
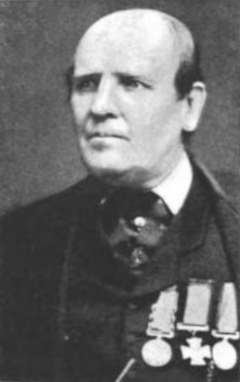
- Born: c. 1822; Bradford, West Riding of Yorkshire, England
- Died: 9 January 1882 (aged 59); Bradford, West Riding of Yorkshire, England
- Burial place: Undercliffe Cemetery, Bradford
- Military career
- Allegiance: United Kingdom
- Branch: British Army
- Rank: Sergeant
- Units: 7th Regiment of Foot
- Conflicts: Crimean War
- Awards: Victoria Cross

Matthew Hughes VC (c. 1822 – 9 January 1882) was an English recipient of the Victoria Cross, the highest and most prestigious award for gallantry in the face of the enemy that can be awarded to British and Commonwealth forces.

Hughes was approximately 33 years old and a private in 7th Regiment of Foot (now The Royal Regiment of Fusiliers), British Army when, during the Crimean War, he performed the acts that saw him recommended for the VC. The full citation was in the first set of awards of the VC published in the London Gazette on 24 February 1857, and read:

War Office, 24th February, 1857.

THE Queen has been graciously pleased to signify Her intention to confer the Decoration of the Victoria Cross on the undermentioned Officers and Men of Her Majesty's Navy and Marines, and Officers, Non-commissioned Officers, and Men of Her Majesty's Army, who have been recommended to Her Majesty for that Decoration, in accordance with the rules laid down in Her Majesty's Warrant of the 29th of January, 1856 on account of acts of bravery performed by them before the Enemy during the late War, as recorded against their several names, viz. :—

[...]

7th Regiment No. 1879 Private Mathew Hughes

Private Mathew Hughes, 7th Royal Fusiliers, was noticed by Colonel Campbell, 90th Light Infantry, on the 7th June, 1855, at the storming of the Quarries, for twice going for ammunition, under a heavy fire, across the open ground; he also went to the front, and brought in Private John Hampton, who was lying severely wounded; and on the 18th June, 1855, he volunteered to bring in Lieutenant Hobson, 7th Royal Fusiliers, who was lying severely wounded, and, in the act of doing so, was severely wounded himself.

Hughes achieved the rank of sergeant that same year, but was later demoted.

== Medal ==
His Victoria Cross is on display at the Tower of London in the Royal Fusiliers Museum.
