= Trystan Owain Hughes =

British theologian (born 1972)

Trystan Owain Hughes (born 1972) is a Christian theologian, historian and author. He is noted for his work in church history, theology and spirituality.

== Biography ==
Hughes was born in Penmaenmawr, North Wales, UK, and is a Welsh language speaker. He attained a Master of Theology from Oxford University and a PhD from Bangor University, Wales. He was Chaplain at Cardiff University and was head of Theology at Trinity University College, Carmarthen, Wales. Until 2023, Hughes was Canon Theologian at Llandaff Cathedral, MA Tutor at St Padarn’s Institute, and Vicar of Christ Church, Roath. Hughes then became the first Director of Ministry Development for the Church in Wales.

He is a regular contributor to BBC Radio 2's Pause for Thought, and to programmes on BBC Radio Cymru and BBC Radio Wales. He is a member of the Church in Wales's governing body and sits on the theological commission that assists the bench of Welsh Bishops. He lectures in theology at Cardiff University and St Michael's Theological College, Llandaff.

Hughes' PhD explored the history of the Welsh churches in the twentieth century, and his subsequent academic work has been published in academic journals, and collections of articles. He has also contributed a number of articles to the Welsh Academy Encyclopaedia of Wales (UWP, 2008).

Hughes's accessible spirituality, reflected in his book Finding Hope and Meaning in Suffering, its website, lectures, talks, and retreats, has made him popular with the religious and secular media.

== Bibliography ==
- Hughes, Trystan Owain (2012). Finding Hope and Meaning in Suffering. New York: SPCK. ISBN 978-0-281-06518-9. OCLC 794327610.
- Hughes, Trystan Owain (2013). The compassion quest. SPCK. ISBN 978-0-281-06825-8. OCLC 824602930.
- Hughes, Trystan Owain (2017). Winds of Change : the Roman Catholic Church and society in Wales, 1916-1962. ISBN 978-1-78683-077-7. OCLC 965339829.
