= Jackie Hughes =

Welsh boxer (born 1923)

Personal information
- Nationality: Welsh
- Born: 13 December 1923 Pontypridd, Wales
- Height: 5 ft 8 in (173 cm)
- Weight: featherweight

Boxing career

Boxing record
- Total fights: 47
- Wins: 24
- Win by KO: 7
- Losses: 20
- Draws: 3
- No contests: 0

Jackie Hughes (born 13 December 1923) was a Welsh professional boxer. Born in Pontypridd, Glamorgan, Hughes was notable for becoming the Welsh featherweight champion in 1949, defending the title successfully twice.
