= Jaquelyne Hughes =

Australian medical researcher and nephrologist

Jaquelyne Hughes is a Torres Strait Islander woman and senior research fellow at Menzies School of Health Research, Charles Darwin University. She also works as a nephrologist at the Royal Darwin Hospital.

== Education and career ==
Hughes obtained her Bachelor of Medicine from the University of Newcastle in 2000, and became a Fellow of the Royal Australasian College of Physicians in nephrology in 2007. She obtained her PhD from Charles Darwin University in 2013.

She invented Australia and New Zealand Dialysis and Transplantation Registry (ANZDATA) Indigenous Working Group (2014–), an Expert Advisor for Indigenous Renal Disease, The Primary Care Education Advisory Committee for Kidney Health Australia (PEAK) (2014–), and former member of RACP Aboriginal and Torres Strait Islander Health Advisory Group (2008–2013).

Hughes was the lead author on a Menzies School of Health Research report, which recommended an overhaul of the renal care system in indigenous communities after compiling the testimonies of dozens of patients and their carers from across Australia. Patients reported the burden of travelling at times over 1000 km for dialysis was unsustainable and led to some patients abandoning treatment.

She is the author of over 40 research publications.

== Awards and recognition ==
- 2012 Northern Territory Tall Poppy Winner
- 2013 Top End (NT) NAIDOC Person of the Year
- 2016 Harry Christian Giese – Research into Action Award
- 2018 Bupa Health Foundation Emerging Health Researcher Award finalist
- 2019 Australian Indigenous Doctors' Association Indigenous Doctor of The Year
