= 1752 =

1752 in various calendars
- Gregorian calendar: 1752; MDCCLII
- Ab urbe condita: 2505
- Armenian calendar: 1201; ԹՎ ՌՄԱ
- Assyrian calendar: 6502
- Balinese saka calendar: 1673–1674
- Bengali calendar: 1158–1159
- Berber calendar: 2702
- British Regnal year: 25 Geo. 2 – 26 Geo. 2
- Buddhist calendar: 2296
- Burmese calendar: 1114
- Byzantine calendar: 7260–7261
- Chinese calendar: 辛未年 (Metal Goat); 4449 or 4242 — to — 壬申年 (Water Monkey); 4450 or 4243
- Coptic calendar: 1468–1469
- Discordian calendar: 2918
- Ethiopian calendar: 1744–1745
- Hebrew calendar: 5512–5513
- Hindu calendars
- Vikram Samvat: 1808–1809
- Shaka Samvat: 1673–1674
- Kali Yuga: 4852–4853
- Holocene calendar: 11752
- Igbo calendar: 752–753
- Iranian calendar: 1130–1131
- Islamic calendar: 1165–1166
- Japanese calendar: Hōreki 2 (宝暦２年)
- Javanese calendar: 1677–1678
- Julian calendar: Gregorian minus 11 days
- Korean calendar: 4085
- Minguo calendar: 160 before ROC 民前160年
- Nanakshahi calendar: 284
- Thai solar calendar: 2294–2295
- Tibetan calendar: ལྕགས་མོ་ལུག་ལོ་ (female Iron-Sheep); 1878 or 1497 or 725 — to — ཆུ་ཕོ་སྤྲེ་ལོ་ (male Water-Monkey); 1879 or 1498 or 726

February 29: The Konbaung Dynasty is founded by Alaungpaya

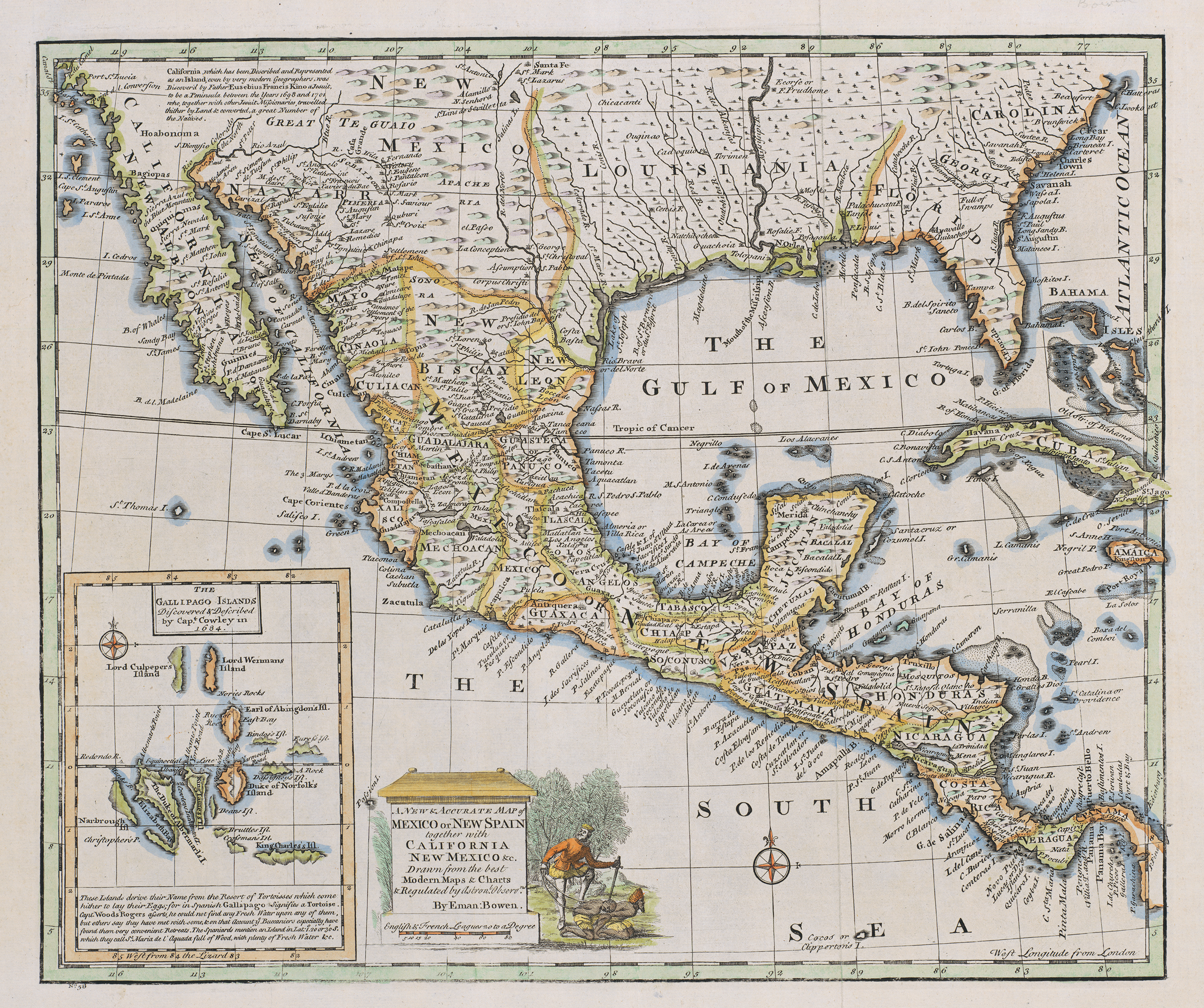
1752 map of New Spain

1752 (MDCCLII) was a leap year starting on Saturday of the Gregorian calendar and a leap year starting on Wednesday of the Julian calendar, the 1752nd year of the Common Era (CE) and Anno Domini (AD) designations, the 752nd year of the 2nd millennium, the 52nd year of the 18th century, and the 3rd year of the 1750s decade. As of the start of 1752, the Gregorian calendar was 11 days ahead of the Julian calendar, which remained in localized use until 1923.

In the British Empire, it was the only year with 355 days: the 11 days from 3 to 13 September were dropped when the Empire adopted the Gregorian calendar.

== Events ==
=== January–March ===
- January 1 – The British Empire (except Scotland, which had changed New Year's Day to January 1 in 1600) adopts today as the first day of the year as part of adoption of the Gregorian calendar, which is completed in September: today is the first day of the New Year under the terms of last year's Calendar Act of the British Parliament.
- February 10 – Pennsylvania Hospital, the first hospital in the United States, and the first to offer medical treatment to the mentally ill, admits its first patients at a temporary location in Philadelphia.
- February 23 – Messier 83 (M83), the "Southern Pinwheel Galaxy" and the first to be cataloged outside the "Local Group" of galaxies nearest to Earth's galaxy, the Milky Way, is discovered by French astronomer Nicolas-Louis de Lacaille. Lacaille, who observes M83 during a research voyage in the Southern Hemisphere, is the first to identify the body as a nebulous object rather than a star. M83, 15 million light-years away, is the most distant object to be identified up to that time.
- February 27 – The Virginia Assembly passes a law making maiming a felony, in response to the practice of gouging.
- February 29 – Alaungpaya, a village chief in Upper Burma, founds the Konbaung Dynasty; by the time of his death 8 years later, he will have unified the whole country.
- March 14 – Shō Kei, the ruler of Okinawa Island and the Ryukyu Kingdom, dies at the age of 41 after a reign that began when he was 13 years old. He is succeeded by his 12-year-old son, Shō Boku, who reigns for 42 years.
- March 18 – The electors of the Republic of Venice (which includes not only a large part of northern Italy around the city of Venice, but portions of Eastern Europe along the Adriatic Sea) elect Francesco Loredan as their new executive, the Doge. Loredan's election comes 11 days after the death of the previous Doge, Pietro Grimani, but is not announced until after Easter Sunday.
- March 23
  - The Halifax Gazette, the first Canadian newspaper, is published.
  - Ava, capital of the Kingdom of Burma, is sacked by Hanthawaddy Kingdom, led by King Binnya Dala.

=== April–June ===
- April 6 – Spanish Governor Tomás Vélez Cachupín of Santa Fe de Nuevo México, a province that now comprises most of the American state of New Mexico, begins the first peace negotiations with the indigenous Comanche tribe after inviting tribal representatives to his home in Taos. As a sign of good faith, he unconditionally releases the four Comanche prisoners of war held at Taos. One of the released Comanches reports to his father, Chief Guanacante, about the hospitality extended to him during his imprisonment, and more meetings take place in July and in the autumn.
- April 12
  - The Kingdom of Afghanistan, under the rule of Ahmad Shah Durrani, recaptures the city of Lahore four years after its capture by the Sikhs of Punjab.
  - The Real Academia de Bellas Artes de San Fernando, Spain's Royal Academy of the Fine Arts, is formally established in Spain, eight years after first being proposed to King Fernando VI by Jeronimo Antonio Gil as a small school in Madrid. The foundation of the Royal Academy is considered by historians to be "an essential step in modernizing Spain" during the Spanish Enlightenment.
- April 13 – The oldest property insurance company in the United States, "Philadelphia Contributionship for the Insurance of Houses from Loss by Fire", holds its organizational meeting at the courthouse in Philadelphia to elect a board of directors, largely through the efforts of Benjamin Franklin. Franklin's newspaper, The Pennsylvania Gazette, has been advertising the meeting since February 18, with a notice that "All persons inclined to subscribe to the articles of insurance of houses from fire, in or near this city, are desired to appear at the Court-house, where attendance will be given, to take in their subscriptions, every seventh day of the week, in the afternoon, until the 13th of April next, being the day appointed by the said articles for electing twelve directors and a treasurer." The property insurance company is still in existence more than 250 years later.
- April 22 – Adam Smith, appointed the year before as a professor of logic, is unanimously elected by the faculty of the University of Glasgow to be the new Professor of Moral Philosophy "on the express condition that he would content himself with the emoluments of the Logic Professorship until 10 October", in that the 1751-1752 salary budgeted for the job has already been distributed to faculty members who had substituted for the previous moral philosophy professor, Thomas Craigie; from April to October, Smith's remuneration for teaching moral philosophy is limited to fees paid directly to him by his students (a half guinea per semester for the public class, and a guinea per semester for the private class). Smith's lectures on ethics are first published in 1759 in his work The Theory of Moral Sentiments.
- May 10 – At Marly-la-Ville in France, physicist Thomas-François Dalibard successfully conducts the kite experiment proposed by Benjamin Franklin in the 1750 book Franklin's Experiments and Observations on Electricity.
- June – Benjamin Franklin reportedly carries out his famous kite experiment, duplicating experiments that show that lightning and electricity are the same. According to Franklin, lightning strikes the kite that he is flying during a thunderstorm and produces sparks identical to what he has previously generated artificially in a Leyden jar. However, the report of his experiment is not made until October 19, in Franklin's newspaper, The Pennsylvania Gazette, leading 20th century researchers to doubt that he conducted the experiment, if at all, until sometime after September 28, when he had written in the Gazette about other such experiments, and that he was making a claim that he had conceived the experiment independently.
- June 3 – A fire destroys 13,000 houses in Moscow in the Russian Empire, only 11 days after a May 23 fire destroyed 5,000 homes; by June 6, two-thirds of the city has been damaged or destroyed.
- June 13 – The Treaty of Logstown is signed by representatives of the Iroquois Confederation, Lenape and Shawnee leaders, and commissioners from Virginia, headed by Joshua Fry. Christopher Gist and William Trent represent the Ohio Company. The treaty grants control over lands south and east of the Ohio River to the English, along with permission to build a fort on the site of what is now Pittsburgh.
- June 21 – Pickawillany (now Piqua, Ohio), the capital of the Miami Indian nation, is attacked and burned by Odawa, Ojibwe and French soldiers under the command of Odawa War Chief Charles Michel de Langlade.

=== July–September ===
- July 1 – In Istanbul, Divitdar Mehmed Emin Pasha is dismissed from his position as Grand Vizier of the Ottoman Empire by the Ottoman Sultan, Mahmud I. The Sultan appoints Çorlulu Ali Pasha as the new Grand Vizier.
- July 30 - An earthquake occurred in Edirne and affected the region all the way to Bulgaria.
- July 30 – The first of the Kronstadt canals, conceived by Peter the Great and designed to link two of the harbors of the Russian city, is completed and opened to maritime traffic.
- August 3 – Edward Cornwallis, the British Governor of Nova Scotia, is recalled to Britain after being unsuccessful in pressuring Nova Scotia's Acadian population to take an oath of allegiance to the Crown or to face expulsion. His replacement, Peregrine Hopson, is more lenient with the Acadians but is reassigned less than two years later.
- August 21 – A group of Scottish Presbyterians who had fled to America from Scotland held the first Covenanter communion in the 13 American colonies, meeting in New Kingstown, Pennsylvania.
- August 25 – The first group of the United Brethren church, commonly called the Moravians, leaves Bethlehem, Pennsylvania on a mission to find 100,000 acres (40,000 ha) of land on which to build "Villages of the Lord" for German emigres to settle upon in America; after a 450-mile (720 km) journey, they arrive in Edenton, North Carolina on September 10 and eventually purchase the Wachovia Tract, a set of lands in the western North Carolina colony.
- September 2 of Julian calendar (Wednesday) (September 13 "New Style") – Great Britain and the British Empire use the Julian calendar for the last time and adopt the Gregorian calendar, making the next day Thursday, September 14 in the English-speaking world. A newspaper at the time notes the next day that "Altho' we have more than once, for the Information of our Readers, publish'd some Accounts of the Alteration of the Style, which took Place this Day, agreeable to a late Act of Parliament, in all his Majesty's Dominions in Europe, Asia, Africa and America" and notes that "The Supputation of the Year began on the first Day of January last, and for the future the first Day of that Month will be stiled the first Day of every Year in all Accounts whatsoever, which Supputation or Reckoning never took Place before this Year in any Courts of Law until the 25th Day of March", and adds, "This Day, had not this Act passed, would have been the 3rd of September, but is now reckoned the 14th, eleven nominal Days being omitted."

=== October–December ===
- October 19 — In his Philadelphia newspaper, the Pennsylvania Gazette, Benjamin Franklin first describes the performance in Philadelphia of the kite experiment that he had proposed in his 1750 book. Although the original account makes no claim that he was the first to do the experiment (which had been done by other scientists (including Thomas-François Dalibard in May), nor that he conducted the test, and it does not give a date for the experiment, it becomes embellished as the story that Franklin "discovered electricity"; in 1766, the story first circulates that Franklin flew the kite in June 1752, without specifying a date (as Franklin had done in other scientific accounts).
- November 3 – A hurricane destroys the Spanish settlement on Florida's Santa Rosa Island, leaving only two buildings standing; the remaining residents decide to move from the barrier island on the Gulf of Mexico and to start a settlement on the nearby mainland and construct the Presidio San Miguel de Panzacola, which later forms the nucleus of the city of Pensacola, Florida.
- November 8 – British Governor Hopson of Nova Scotia and French Governor General of New France, the Marquis Duquesne, agree to a free exchange of deserters from each other's armies in Canada, with the understanding that neither side will execute a deserter once returned.
- November 22 – "Father Le Loutre's War", the war between the British Canadian colonists of Nova Scotia and the indigenous Mi'kmaq (Micmac) tribe halts temporarily when a peace treaty is signed between the warring parties at Shubenacadie, Nova Scotia. Governor Hopson, accompanied by former Governor Cornwallis, signs on behalf of the British and Chief Kopit (Jean-Baptiste Cope), the Sakamaw of the Mi'kmaq, signs on behalf of his people.
- December 5 – The first presentation of a Shakespearean play in America is performed when a company of players stages The Merchant of Venice in Williamsburg, Virginia.

== Births ==
=== January ===
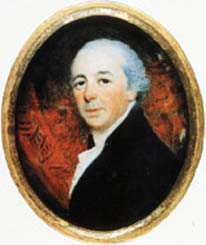
John Nash

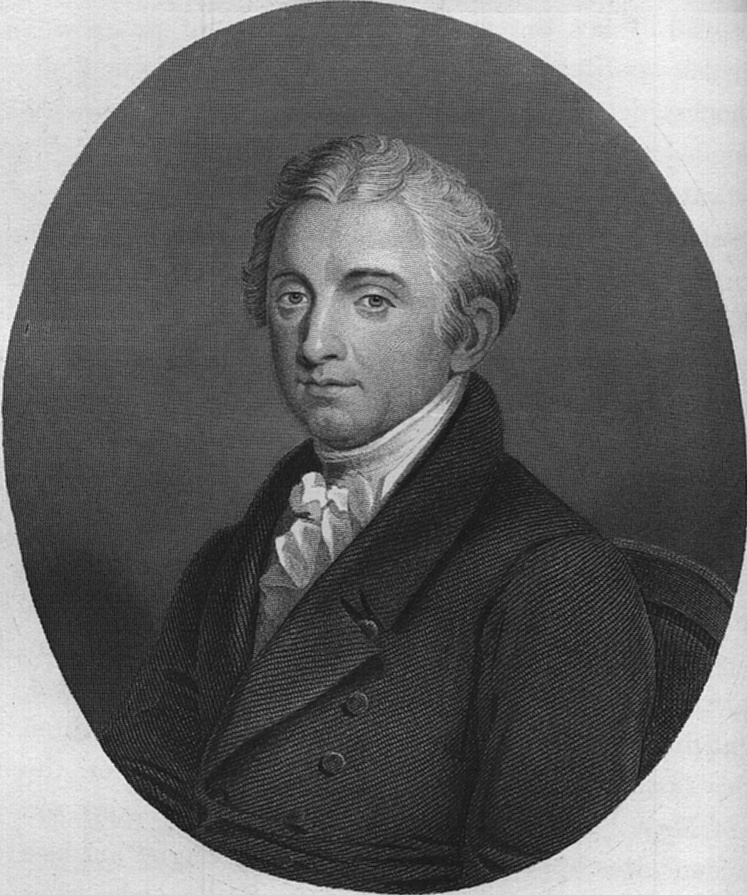
Gouverneur Morris

- January 1 – Betsy Ross, American entrepreneur, creator of the American flag (d. 1836)
- January 2
  - Nicholas Owen, Welsh Anglican priest, antiquarian (d. 1811)
  - Philip Morin Freneau, American poet (d. 1832)
- January 3 – Johannes von Müller, Swiss historian (d. 1809)
- January 4
- January 6 – Pierre Bouchet, French physician (d. 1794)
- January 10 – Laurent Jean François Truguet, French admiral (d. 1839)
- January 13
  - Eleonora Fonseca Pimentel, Italian poet and revolutionary (d. 1799)
  - Sir Philip Anstruther-Paterson, 3rd Baronet, Scottish politician (d. 1808)
- January 16
  - Nicolas-François Guillard, French librettist (d. 1814)
- January 17
  - George Baylor, officer in the American Continental Army (d. 1784)
- January 18
  - Alexander Kurakin, Russian diplomat (d. 1818)
  - John Nash, English architect (d. 1835)
  - Francesco Caracciolo, Neapolitan admiral, revolutionist (d. 1799)
  - Alexander Lindsay, 6th Earl of Balcarres, British Army general (d. 1825)
  - Louis Dufresne, French ornithologist, taxidermist (d. 1832)
- January 19 – James Morris III, Continental Army officer from Connecticut (d. 1820)
- January 20 – Jean-Baptiste Radet, French playwright (d. 1830)
- January 22
  - Robert Smith, 1st Baron Carrington (d. 1838)
- January 24 – Muzio Clementi, Italian composer, pianist (d. 1832)
- January 29
  - Pierre Martin, French Navy officer, admiral (d. 1820)
  - John Macleod, British Army general (d. 1833)
- January 31 – Gouverneur Morris, American diplomat, politician (d. 1815)

=== February ===
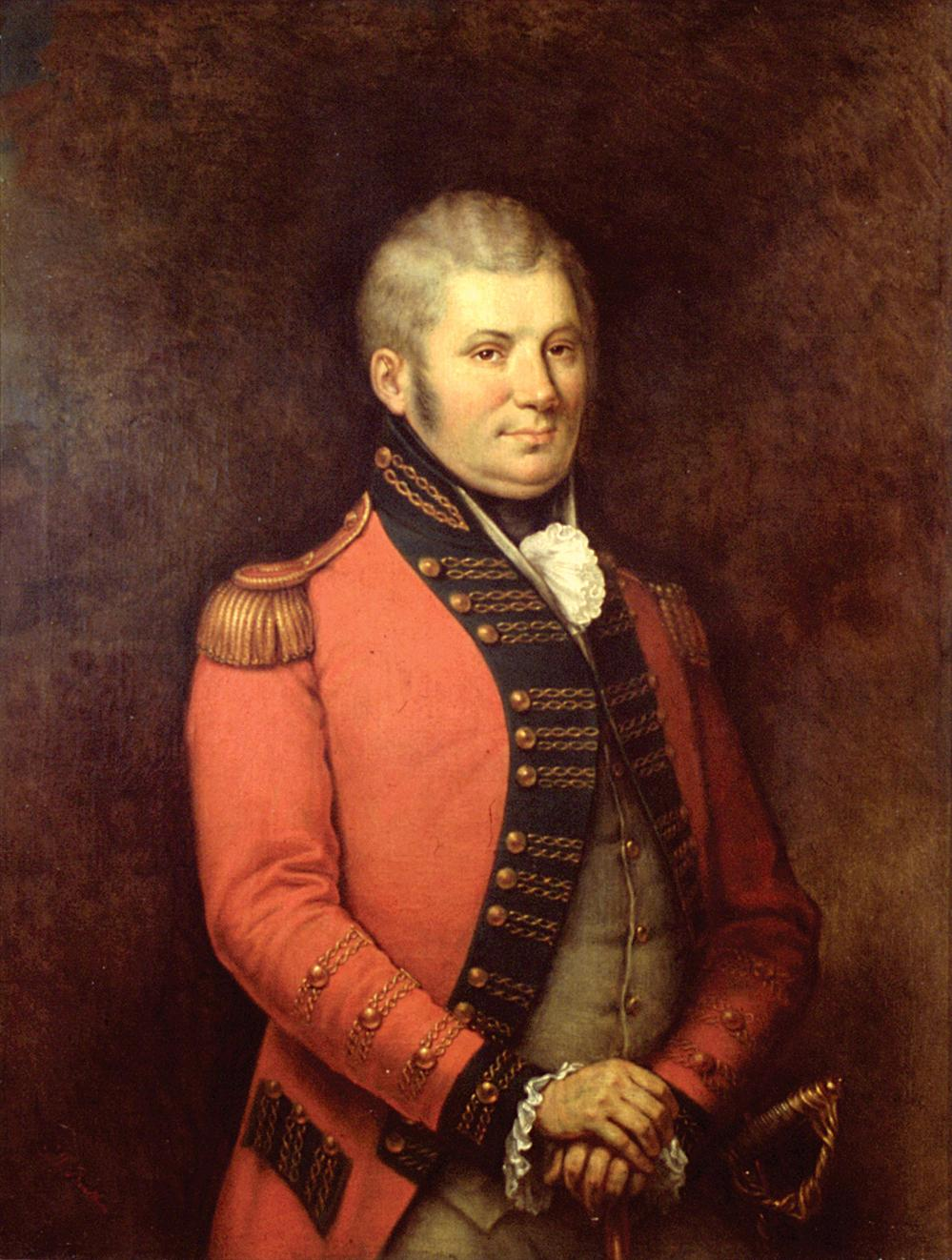
John Graves Simcoe

- February 4 – Gerrit Paape, Dutch politician, writer (d. 1803)
- February 5
  - Anton Walter, Austrian piano maker (d. 1826)
- February 8 – Victurnien-Jean-Baptiste de Rochechouart de Mortemart, French general, politician (d. 1812)
- February 9
  - Ebenezer Sproat, Continental Army officer, pioneer to the Ohio Country (d. 1805)
- February 12
  - Josef Reicha (d. 1795)
  - Dorothea Ackermann, German actress (d. 1821)
- February 13
  - Luise von Göchhausen, German lady in waiting (d. 1807)
  - Giovanni Fabbroni, Italian scientist (d. 1822)
- February 16 – Friedrich Karl Wilhelm, Fürst zu Hohenlohe, Austrian general (d. 1814)
- February 17 – Friedrich Maximilian Klinger, German writer (d. 1831)
- February 19 – Francesco Ruspoli, 3rd Prince of Cerveteri (d. 1829)
- February 19 – Simone Assemani, Italian orientalist (d. 1821)
- February 23 – Simon Knéfacz, Croatian writer (d. 1819)
- February 26 – James Winchester, American general and politician (d. 1826)
- February 27 – William Linn, American President of Queen's College) (d. 1808)

=== March ===
- March 3 – Thomas Hardy (political reformer) (d. 1832)
- March 5 – Leendert Viervant the Younger, Dutch architect (d. 1801)
- March 8
  - Johann David Schoepff, German biologist (d. 1800)
  - Robert Clifford, English cricketer (d. 1811)
- March 11
  - Sir Charles Hastings, 1st Baronet, British Army officer (d. 1823)
  - Joseph Malboeuf, dit Beausoleil, Member of Legislative Assembly of Lower Canada (d. 1823)
- March 14
  - Claude-Jean Martin, French Navy officer (d. 1827)
  - Jean-François-Auguste Moulin, member of the French Directory (d. 1810)
- March 16 – Antoine Joseph Santerre, French general (d. 1809)
- March 19 – Giuseppe Colucci, Italian historian of the Marche, writer (d. 1809)
- March 20 – Robert Newman, American sexton at the Old North Church in Boston (d. 1804)
- March 21
  - Maurice d'Elbée, French Royalist military officer (d. 1794)
  - Mary Dixon Kies, American inventor, first recipient of a U.S. patent (d. 1837)
- March 23 – Friedrich Wilhelm von Reden, German pioneer in mining and metallurgy (d. 1815)
- March 24 – Antoine Joseph Gorsas, French publicist, politician (d. 1793)
- March 25 – Carlos Fitz-James Stuart, 4th Duke of Liria and Jérica, Spanish duke (d. 1787)

=== April ===
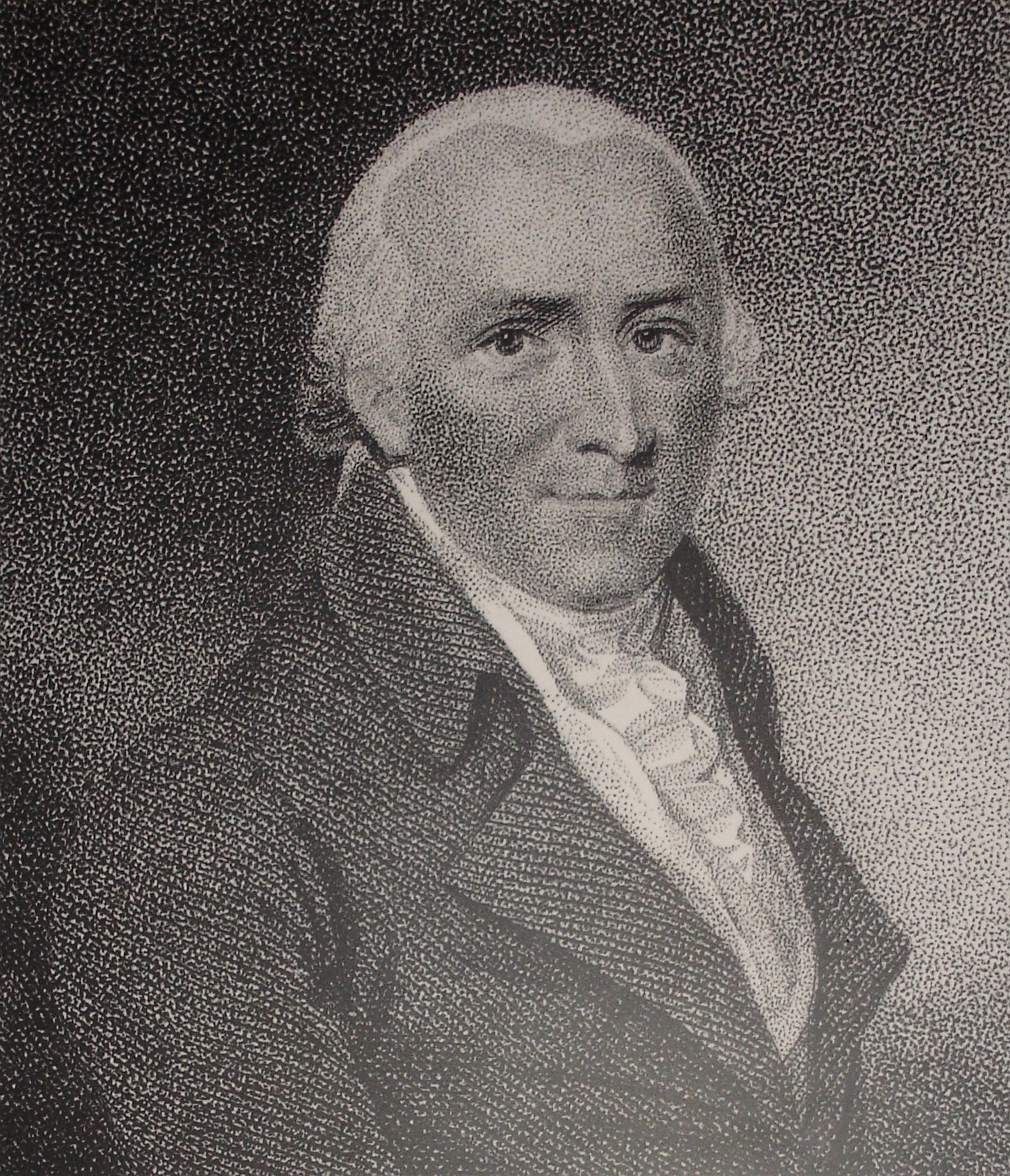
Humphry Repton

- April 4
  - Niccolò Antonio Zingarelli, Italian composer (d. 1837)
  - Jean-Pierre Saint-Ours, Swiss artist (d. 1809)
- April 5 – Sébastien Érard, German-born French instrument maker (d. 1831)
- April 6 – Meno Haas, German-born copperplate engraver (d. 1833)
- April 9 – Rudolph Zacharias Becker, German educator and author (d. 1822)
- April 17 – John Austin, Scottish inventor (d. 1830)
- April 18 – Sir Thomas Dyke Acland, 9th Baronet (d. 1794)
- April 19
  - John Henniker-Major, 2nd Baron Henniker, British politician (d. 1821)
  - Friederike Brion, first great love of Johann Wolfgang Goethe (d. 1813)
- April 21
  - Pierre-Alexandre-Laurent Forfait, French engineer (d. 1807)
  - Humphry Repton, English garden designer (d. 1818)
- April 23 – John Willett Payne, British Royal Navy admiral (d. 1803)
- April 28 – Matsumura Goshun, Japanese artist (d. 1811)

=== May ===
- May 4
  - John Brooks (governor), Massachusetts doctor, military officer, governor (d. 1825)
  - François Adriaan van der Kemp, Dutch politician (d. 1829)
- May 5 – Johann Tobias Mayer, German physicist (d. 1830)
- May 9 – Johann Anton Leisewitz, German lawyer and dramatic poet (d. 1806)
- May 9 – Antonio Scarpa, Italian anatomist (d. 1832)
- May 10
  - Amalie of Zweibrücken-Birkenfeld, First Queen of Saxony/Duchess of Warsaw (d. 1828)
  - Pierre de Ruel, marquis de Beurnonville, French general (d. 1821)
- May 11 – Johann Friedrich Blumenbach, German anthropologist (d. 1840)
- May 13 – Michael Hughes, Welsh industrialist (d. 1825)

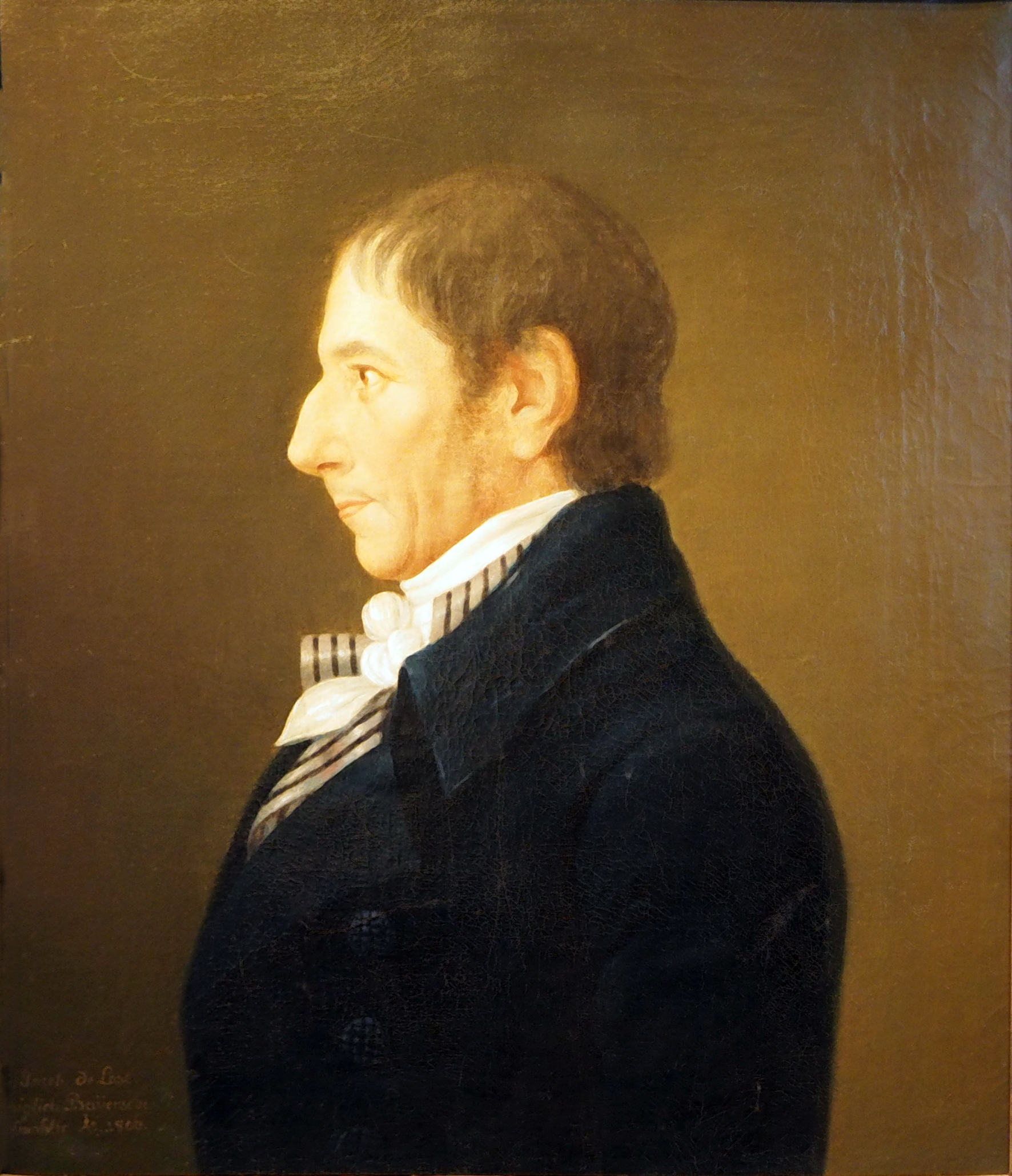
Albrecht Thaer

- May 14
  - Albrecht Thaer, German agronomist (d. 1828)
  - Timothy Dwight IV, American academic, educator (d. 1817)
  - Juliane Reichardt, German-born Bohemian pianist, singer and composer (d. 1783)
- May 17 – Thomas Boude, American politician (d. 1822)
- May 20
  - Charles-Louis Antiboul, French Girondist politician (d. 1793)
- May 22 – Louis Legendre, French politician of the Revolution period (d. 1797)
- May 24
  - Oliver Cromwell, African-American soldier (d. 1853)
- May 26
  - Antoine Brice, Belgian painter (d. 1817)
  - William Badger, master shipbuilder operating in Kittery, Maine (d. 1830)
- May 28 – Robert Carr Brackenbury, English Methodist preacher (d. 1818)
- May 29 – Charles Whitworth, 1st Earl Whitworth, British diplomat (d. 1825)
- May 31 – John Marsh, English music composer (d. 1828)

=== June ===
- June 5
  - George Burder, English Nonconformist divine (d. 1832)
  - Hardy Murfree, American soldier (d. 1809)
- June 6 – John Gabriel Jones, Kentucky pioneer and statesman (d. 1776)
- June 8 – Sir James Lamb, 1st Baronet of England (d. 1824)
- June 11
  - Christian Graf von Haugwitz, German statesman (d. 1832)
  - Eliphalet Pearson, American educator (d. 1826)

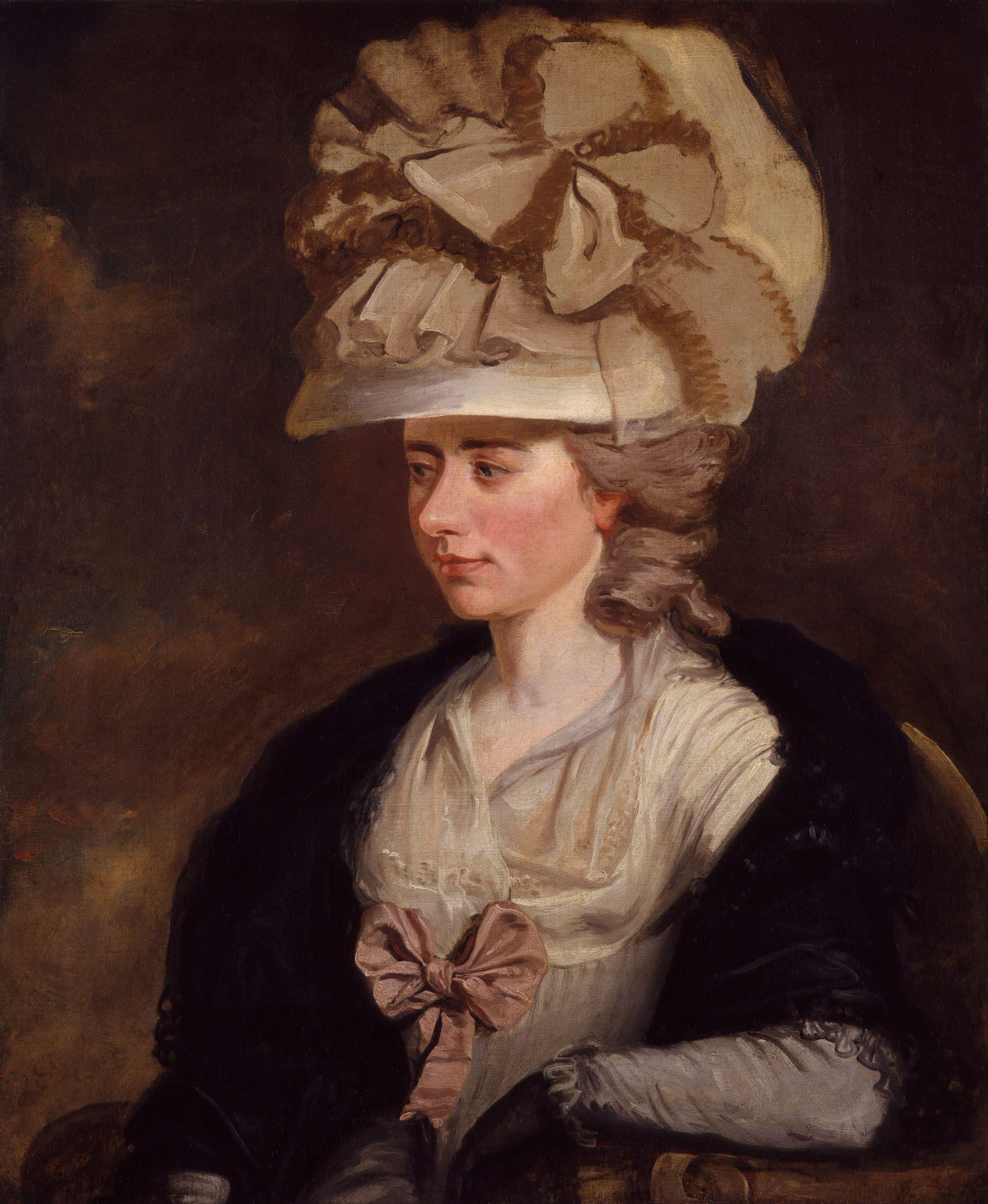
Frances Burney

- June 13 – Fanny Burney, English novelist, diarist (d. 1840)
- June 15 – Paul Cobb Methuen, British politician (d. 1816)
- June 19 – Lord Richard Cavendish (1752–1781), second son of William Cavendish (d. 1781)
- June 24 – Horatio Walpole, 2nd Earl of Orford (d. 1822)
- June 27 – Hannah Mather Crocker, American essayist, advocate of women's rights in America (d. 1829)
- June 29 – Christopher Frederik Lowzow, Danish-Norwegian army officer (d. 1829)

=== July ===
- July 1 – Thomas Pelham-Clinton, 3rd Duke of Newcastle, British Army general (d. 1795)
- July 3 – Heinrich Philipp Konrad Henke, German Lutheran theologian (d. 1809)
- July 4 – Ignace-Michel-Louis-Antoine d'Irumberry de Salaberry, Canadian politician (d. 1828)
- July 5
  - Luke Hansard, English printer (d. 1828)
- July 7 – Joseph Marie Jacquard, French inventor (d. 1834)
- July 8 – Morton Eden, 1st Baron Henley, British diplomat (d. 1830)

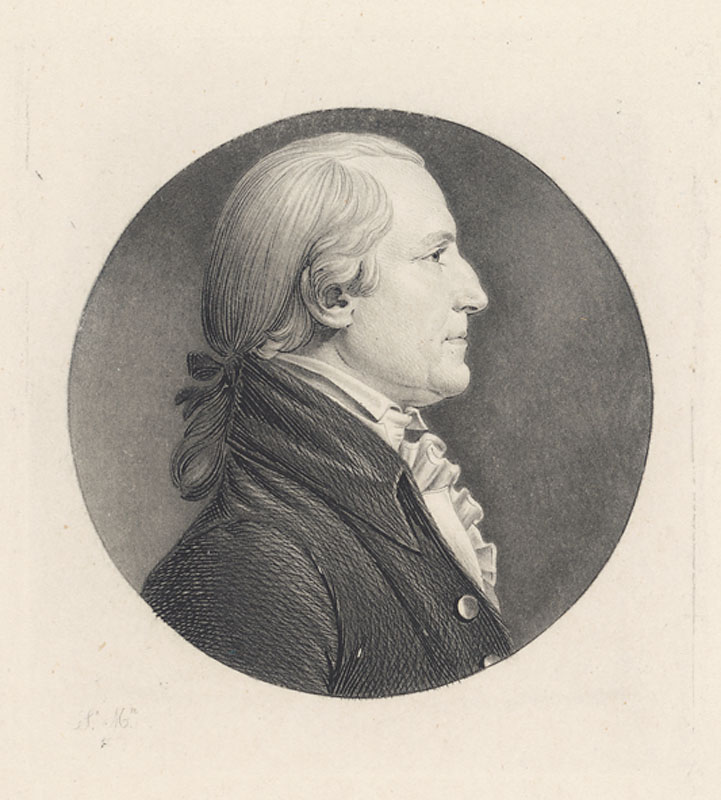
St. George Tucker

- July 10
  - David Humphreys, American diplomat (d. 1818)
- July 14 – Andreas Joseph Hofmann, German philosopher and revolutionary (d. 1849)
- July 17 – Barnaba Oriani, Italian priest (d. 1832)
- July 20 – Guillaume-Jean-Noël de Lavillegris, French Navy officer (d. 1807)
- July 23 – Marc-Auguste Pictet, Swiss physicist (d. 1825)
- July 27 – Samuel Smith (Maryland politician), American politician (d. 1839)
- July 29 – John Manners-Sutton, British politician (d. 1826)
- July 30 – Valentine Quin, 1st Earl of Dunraven and Mount-Earl, Irish politician (d. 1824)

=== August ===
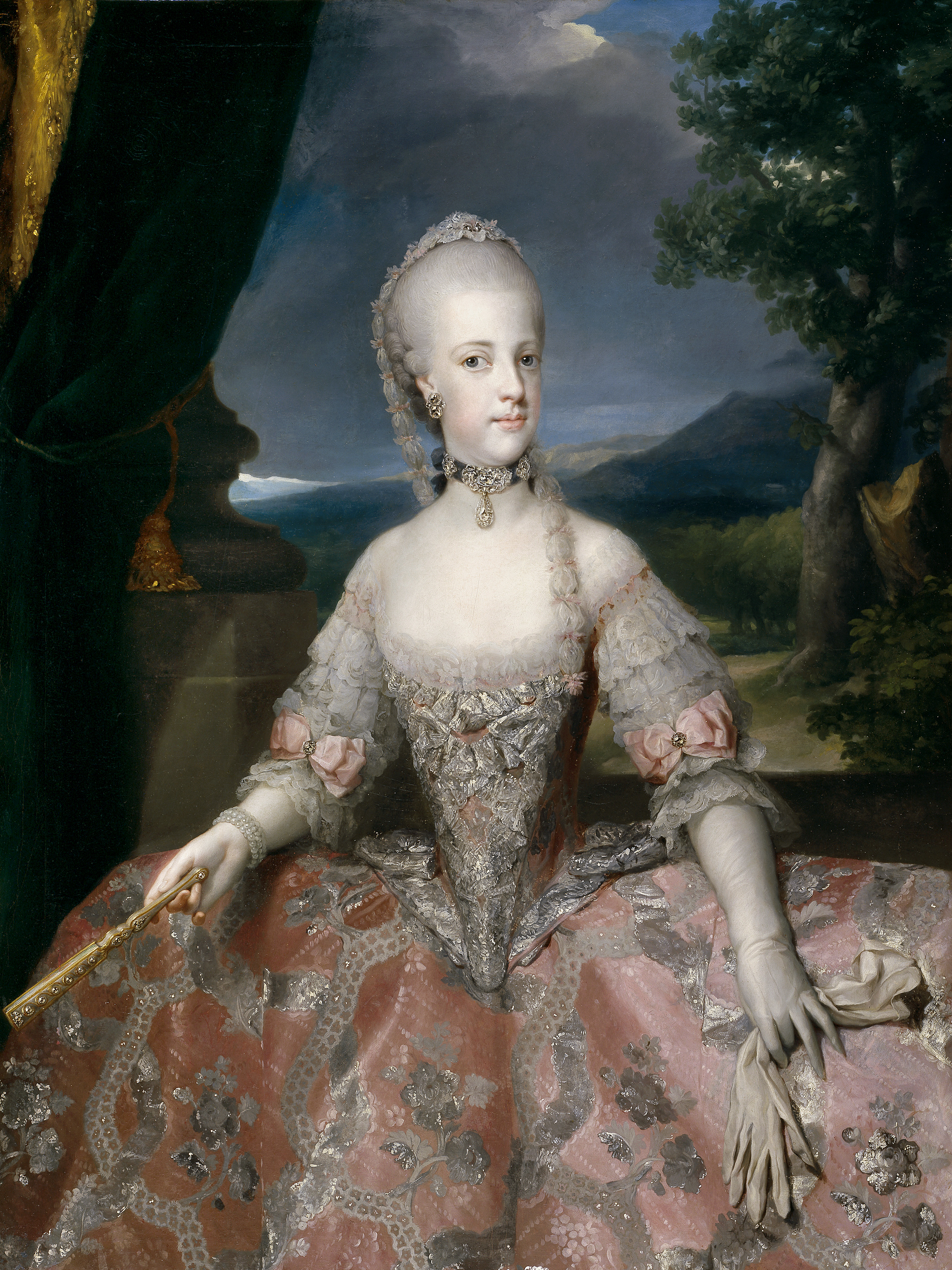
Maria Carolina of Austria

- August 6 – Princess Louise of Saxe-Meiningen, Landgravine of Hesse-Philippsthal-Barchfeld (d. 1805)
- August 13 – Queen Marie Caroline of Naples and Sicily (d. 1814)
- August 19 – Herman Bultos, Belgian wine merchant and theatre director (d. 1801)
- August 21
  - Antonio Cavallucci, Italian painter (d. 1795)
  - Jacques Roux, French priest (d. 1794)
  - Michel Ange Bernard Mangourit, French diplomat (d. 1829)
- August 22 – Alexander Tormasov, Russian general (d. 1819)
- August 25
  - Lodovico Gallina, Italian painter (d. 1787)
  - Karl Mack von Leiberich, Austrian soldier (d. 1828)

=== September ===
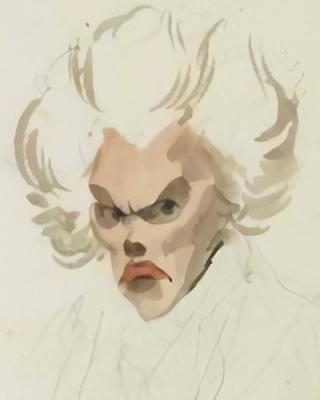
Adrien-Marie Legendre

- September 8 – Carl Stenborg, Swedish opera singer (d. 1813)
- September 18 – Adrien-Marie Legendre, French mathematician (d. 1833)
- September 21 – Antoine de Bosc de la Calmette, Danish statesman, landscape architect (d. 1803)
- September 22
  - James Bowdoin III, American philanthropist and statesman (d. 1811)
  - Ruler Jeongjo of Joseon (d. 1800)
- September 27
  - Marie-Gabriel-Florent-Auguste de Choiseul-Gouffier, French diplomat (d. 1817)
  - Nathaniel Curzon, 2nd Baron Scarsdale of Great Britain (d. 1837)
- September 28 – John the Painter, British criminal (d. 1777)
- September 30
  - Justin Heinrich Knecht, German composer, organist and music theorist (d. 1817)
  - William Adams, British politician (d. 1811)

=== October ===
- October 2
  - Samuel Story, Dutch admiral (d. 1811)
  - Joseph Ritson, English antiquary (d. 1803)
- October 6 – Jeanne-Louise-Henriette Campan, French educator, lady in waiting (d. 1822)
- October 13 – William Grant, British lawyer, politician and judge (d. 1832)
- October 16
  - Adolph Freiherr Knigge, German writer, Freemason (d. 1796)
  - Joseph Papineau, Canadian politician (d. 1841)
- October 17 – Jacob Broom, American businessman, politician (d. 1810)
- October 20 – Fabian Gottlieb von Osten-Sacken, Baltic-German field marshal (d. 1837)
- October 22 – Ambrogio Minoja, Italian composer, professor of music (d. 1825)
- October 23 – Maria Anna Adamberger, Austrian stage actress (d. 1804)
- October 28 – Jean Henri Simon, Belgian engraver, soldier (d. 1834)

=== November ===
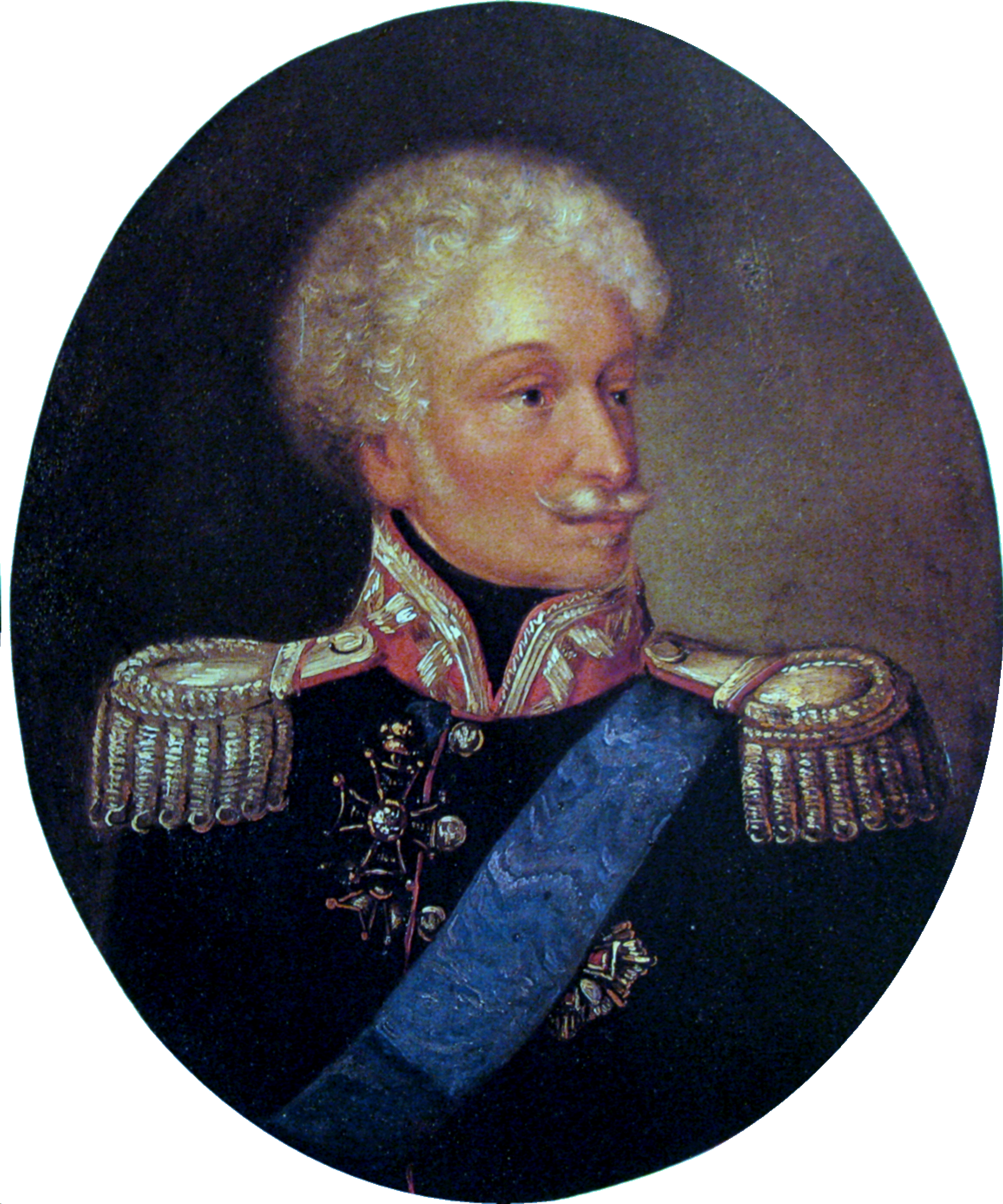
Józef Zajączek

- November 1 – Józef Zajączek, Polish general, politician (d. 1826)
- November 2
  - Andrey Razumovsky, Russian diplomat (d. 1836)
  - Thomas Carpenter, American glassmaker (d. 1847)
- November 4
  - George Finch, 9th Earl of Winchilsea, English cricketer (d. 1826)
  - Jean-Gérard Lacuée, count of Cessac (d. 1841)
- November 5
  - Jens Holmboe, Norwegian bailiff (d. 1804)
  - Richard Richards (judge), British politician (d. 1823)
- November 8 – Claude-Augustin Tercier, French general (d. 1823)
- November 11 – John McMillan, Presbyterian minister, missionary in Pennsylvania (d. 1833)
- November 17 – Caspar Voght, German businessman (d. 1839)
- November 18 – P. H. Frimann, Norwegian-Danish poet (d. 1839)

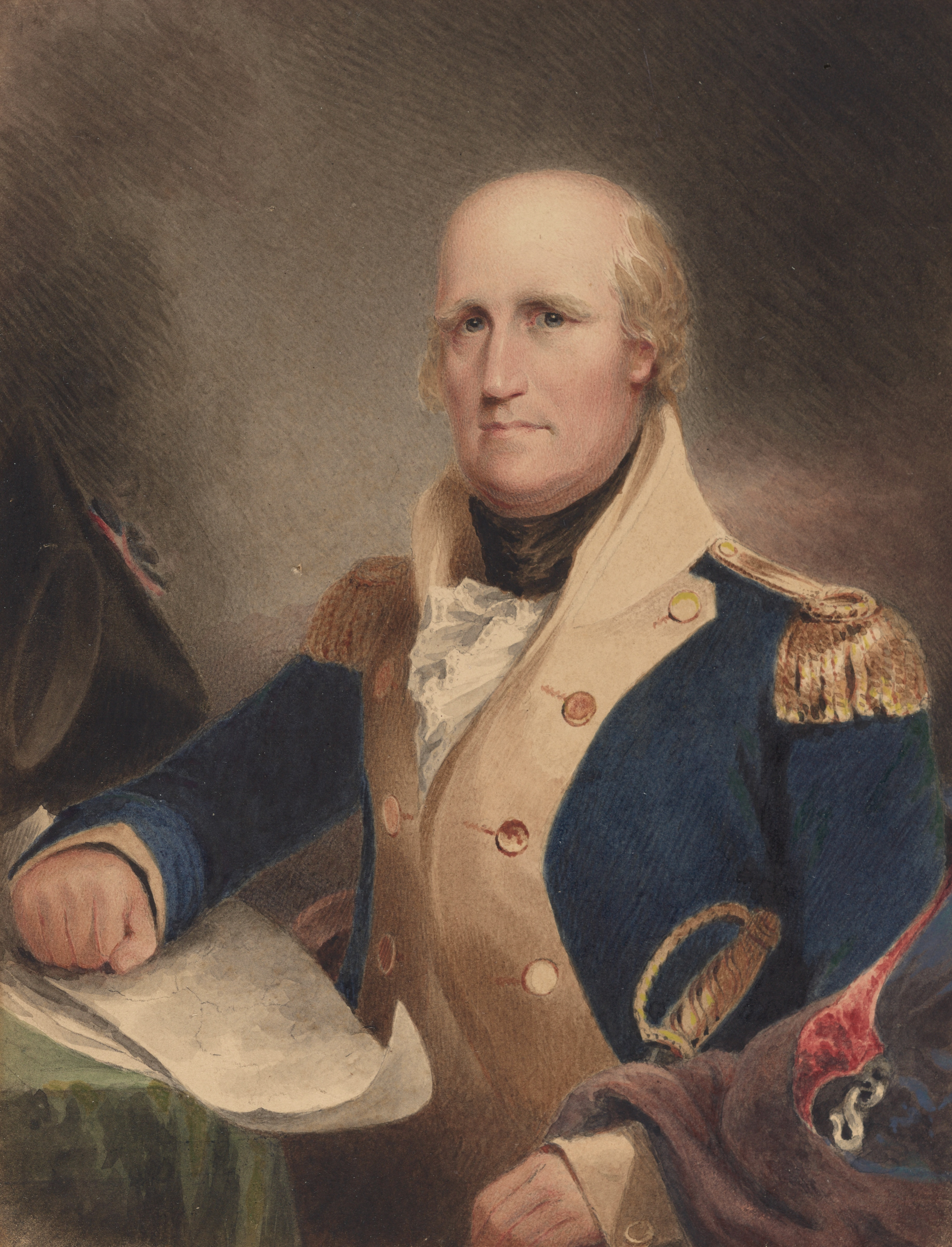
George Rogers Clark

- November 19 – George Rogers Clark, American soldier, officer and explorer (d. 1818)

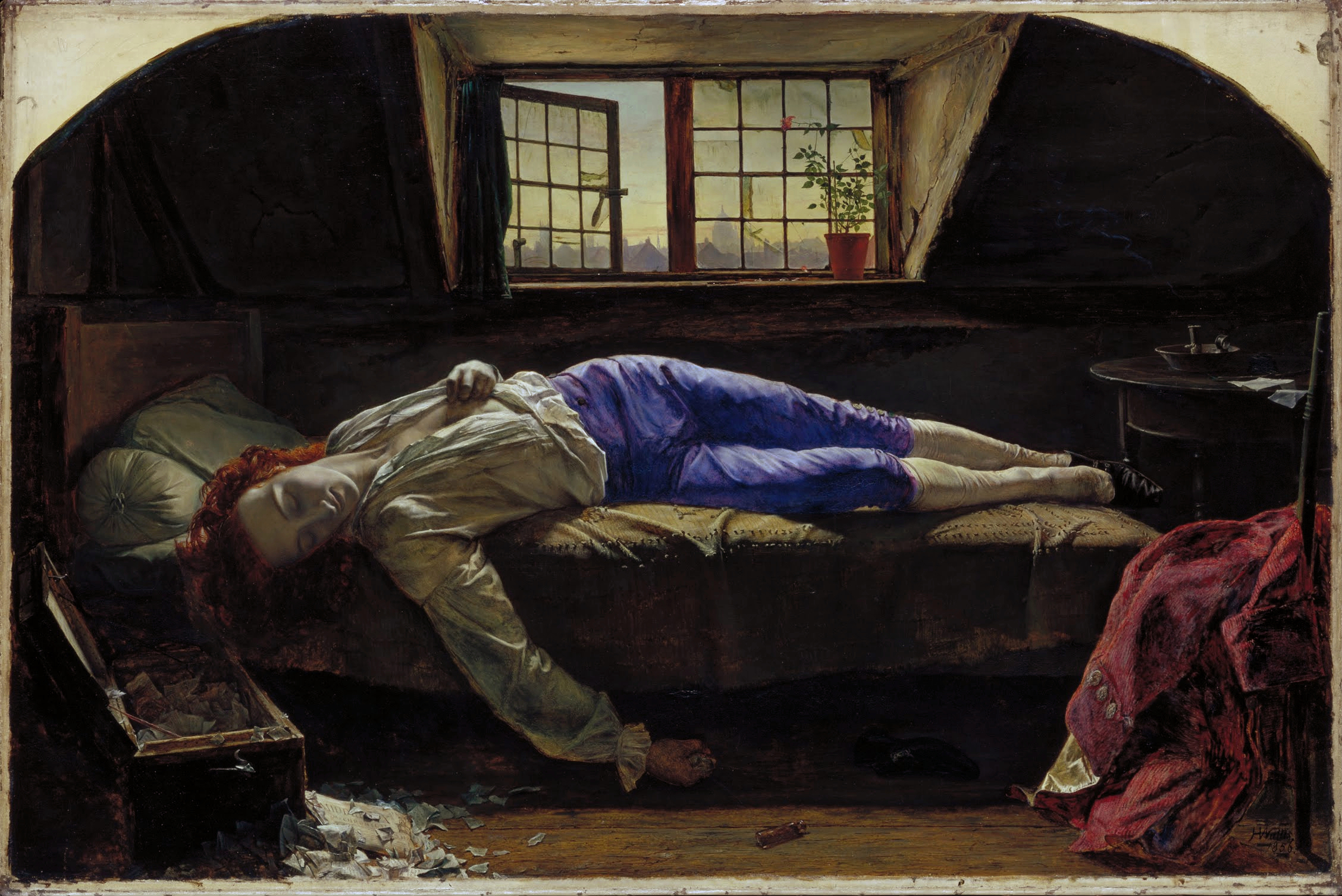
Thomas Chatterton

- November 20
  - Thomas Chatterton, English poet (d. 1770)
- November 21 – George Pozer, German-born British merchant (d. 1848)
- November 23 – Maksimilijan Vrhovac, Croatian Catholic bishop (d. 1827)
- November 25 – Johann Friedrich Reichardt, German composer (d. 1814)
- November 29 – Philippe-André Grandidier, French priest, historian (d. 1787)
- November 29 – Jemima Wilkinson, American preacher (d. 1819)

=== December ===
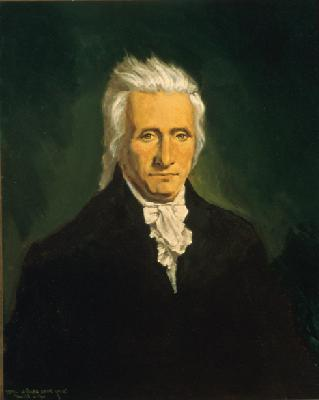
Gabriel Duvall

- December 3 – Leonard Gyllenhaal, Swedish military officer, entomologist (d. 1840)
- December 6
  - Robert de Lamanon, French botanist (d. 1787)
- December 8
  - Sir John Barrington, 9th Baronet of Great Britain (d. 1818)
  - Placidus a Spescha, Swiss mountain climber (d. 1833)
  - Vicesimus Knox, English essayist, minister (d. 1821)
- December 9 – Antoine Étienne de Tousard, French general, military engineer (d. 1813)
- December 12
  - Thomas Bulkeley, 7th Viscount Bulkeley, English aristocrat and politician (d. 1822)
  - Pedro Andrés del Alcázar, Spanish and later Chilean Army officer and war hero (d. 1820)
- December 14 – Christoph August Tiedge, German poet (d. 1841)
- December 17 – John Kilby Smith, American Continental army officer (d. 1842)
- December 19 – François Isaac de Rivaz, French inventor, politician (d. 1828)
- December 21 – Jean-François Houbigant, French perfumer (d. 1807)
- December 28 – Conrad Tanner, Swiss abbot (d. 1825)
- December 30 – Sir Charles Malet, 1st Baronet, British East India Company official (d. 1815)

== Deaths ==
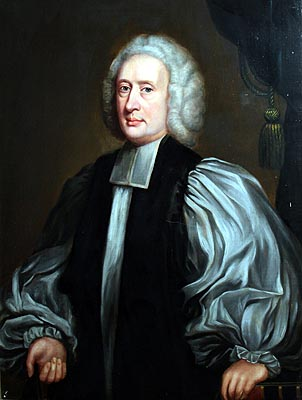
Joseph Butler

William Whiston

- January 4 – Gabriel Cramer, Swiss mathematician (b. 1704)
- January 14 – Devasahayam Pillai, beatified Indian Catholic (b. 1712)
- January 16 – Francis Blomefield, English topographer (b. 1705)
- February 9 – Fredrik Hasselqvist, Swedish traveller and naturalist (b. 1722)
- February 10 – Henriette of France, daughter of King Louis XV (b. 1727)
- February 15 – Beinta Broberg, notorious Faroese vicar's wife (b. 1667)
- March 9 – Claude Joseph Geoffroy, brother of Étienne François Geoffroy (b. 1685)
- March 21 – Gio Nicola Buhagiar, Maltese painter (b. 1698)
- April 29 – Matthew Michell, English politician (b. 1705)
- May 3 – Samuel Ogle, British provincial Governor of Maryland (b. 1694)
- May 6 – Sophia of Saxe-Weissenfels, Countess of Brandenburg-Bayreuth, German aristocrat and culture patron (b. 1684)
- May 22 – Johann Alexander Thiele, German painter (b. 1685)
- May 23 – William Bradford, British-born printer (b. 1663)
- June 16
  - Giulio Alberoni, Italian cardinal (b. 1664)
  - Joseph Butler, English priest, theologian (b. 1692)
- June 21 – Old Briton, Piankashaw chieftain (b. c. 1695)
- July 20 – Johann Christoph Pepusch, German composer (b. 1667)
- July 29 – Peter Warren, British admiral (b. 1703)
- August 22 – William Whiston, English mathematician (b. 1667)
- September 1 – Jacopo Amigoni, Italian painter (b. 1675)
- November 2 – Johann Albrecht Bengel, German scholar (b. 1687)
- November 5 – Carl Andreas Duker, German classical scholar (b. 1670)
- November 6 – Ralph Erskine, Scottish minister (b. 1685)
- November 27 – William Digby, 5th Baron Digby, English politician, baron (b. 1661)
- December 3 – Henri-Guillaume Hamal, Walloon musician and composer (b. 1685)
- December 11 – Adolphus Frederick III, Duke of Mecklenburg-Strelitz (b. 1686)
