= Michael Hughes =

Michael Hughes may refer to:

== Sports ==
- Michael Hughes (basketball) (born 1998), American basketball player
- Michael Hughes (footballer) (born 1971), Northern Irish footballer
- Michael Hughes (kicker) (born 2002), American football player
- Mickey Hughes (1866–1931), American MLB baseball pitcher of the 1880s and 1890s
- Mickey Hughes (boxer) (born 1962), English boxer of the 1980s and 1990s
- Mike Hughes (American football) (born 1997), American football player
- Mike Hughes (footballer) (1940–2018), Welsh footballer
- Mike Hughes (rower) (born 1959), Canadian rower
- Mike Hughes (wrestler) (born 1974), Canadian wrestler

== Other ==
- Michael Hughes (industrialist) (1752–1825), Welsh industrialist
- Michael Hughes (priest) (died 1680), Welsh Anglican priest
- Michael Hughes (serial killer), American serial killer
- Michael Hughes-Young, 1st Baron St Helens (1912–1980), British army officer and politician
- Michael Hughes, member of English folk group The Young'uns
- Michael Anthony Hughes (born 1988), missing person who was abducted in 1994
- Mike Hughes (daredevil) (1956–2020), American daredevil, amateur rocketeer, and flat Earth proponent
- Mikey Hughes, contestant in Big Brother UK
