= 1793 =

1793 in various calendars
- Gregorian calendar: 1793; MDCCXCIII
- French Republican calendar: 1–2; I–II
- Ab urbe condita: 2546
- Armenian calendar: 1242; ԹՎ ՌՄԽԲ
- Assyrian calendar: 6543
- Balinese saka calendar: 1714–1715
- Bengali calendar: 1199–1200
- Berber calendar: 2743
- British Regnal year: 33 Geo. 3 – 34 Geo. 3
- Buddhist calendar: 2337
- Burmese calendar: 1155
- Byzantine calendar: 7301–7302
- Chinese calendar: 壬子年 (Water Rat); 4490 or 4283 — to — 癸丑年 (Water Ox); 4491 or 4284
- Coptic calendar: 1509–1510
- Discordian calendar: 2959
- Ethiopian calendar: 1785–1786
- Hebrew calendar: 5553–5554
- Hindu calendars
- Vikram Samvat: 1849–1850
- Shaka Samvat: 1714–1715
- Kali Yuga: 4893–4894
- Holocene calendar: 11793
- Igbo calendar: 793–794
- Iranian calendar: 1171–1172
- Islamic calendar: 1207–1208
- Japanese calendar: Kansei 5 (寛政５年)
- Javanese calendar: 1719–1720
- Julian calendar: Gregorian minus 11 days
- Korean calendar: 4126
- Minguo calendar: 119 before ROC 民前119年
- Nanakshahi calendar: 325
- Thai solar calendar: 2335–2336
- Tibetan calendar: ཆུ་ཕོ་བྱི་བ་ལོ་ (male Water-Rat); 1919 or 1538 or 766 — to — ཆུ་མོ་གླང་ལོ་ (female Water-Ox); 1920 or 1539 or 767

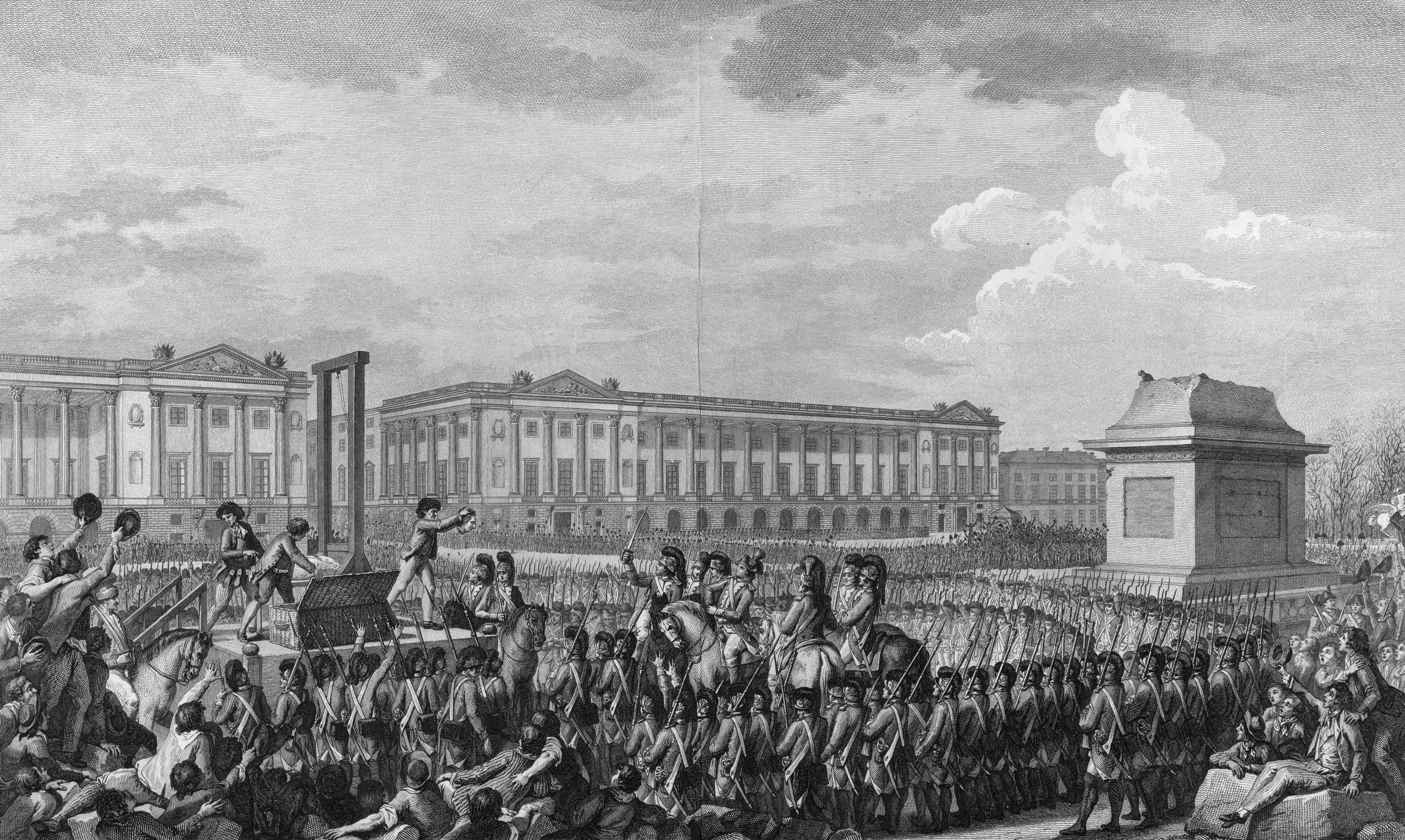
January 21: King Louis XVI is guillotined in Paris.

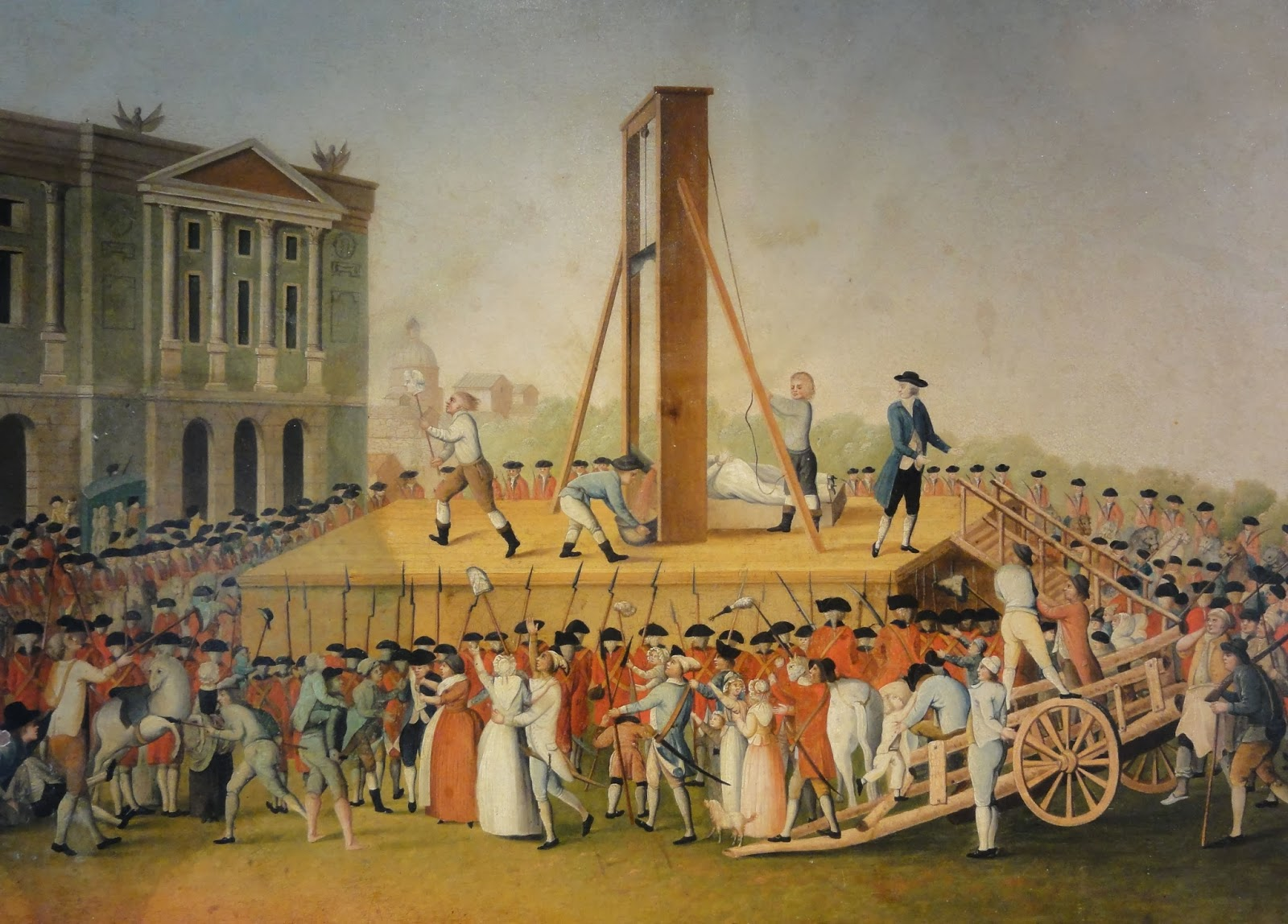
October 16: Former French Queen Marie Antoinette is publicly executed.

1793 (MDCCXCIII) was a common year starting on Tuesday of the Gregorian calendar and a common year starting on Saturday of the Julian calendar, the 1793rd year of the Common Era (CE) and Anno Domini (AD) designations, the 793rd year of the 2nd millennium, the 93rd year of the 18th century, and the 4th year of the 1790s decade. As of the start of 1793, the Gregorian calendar was 11 days ahead of the Julian calendar, which remained in localized use until 1923.

The French Republic introduced the French Revolutionary Calendar starting with the year I.

== Events ==
=== January–June ===
- January 2 – Premiere of Mozart's Requiem (completed after the composer's death in 1791 by Franz Xaver Süssmayr) in a performance for the benefit of Mozart's widow, Constanze.
- January 7 – The Ebel riot occurs in Sweden.
- January 9 – Jean-Pierre Blanchard becomes the first to fly in a gas balloon in the United States.
- January 13 – Nicolas Jean Hugon de Bassville, a representative of Revolutionary France, is lynched by a mob in Rome.
- January 21 – French Revolution: After being found guilty of treason by the French National Convention, Citizen Capet, formerly King Louis XVI, is guillotined in Paris.
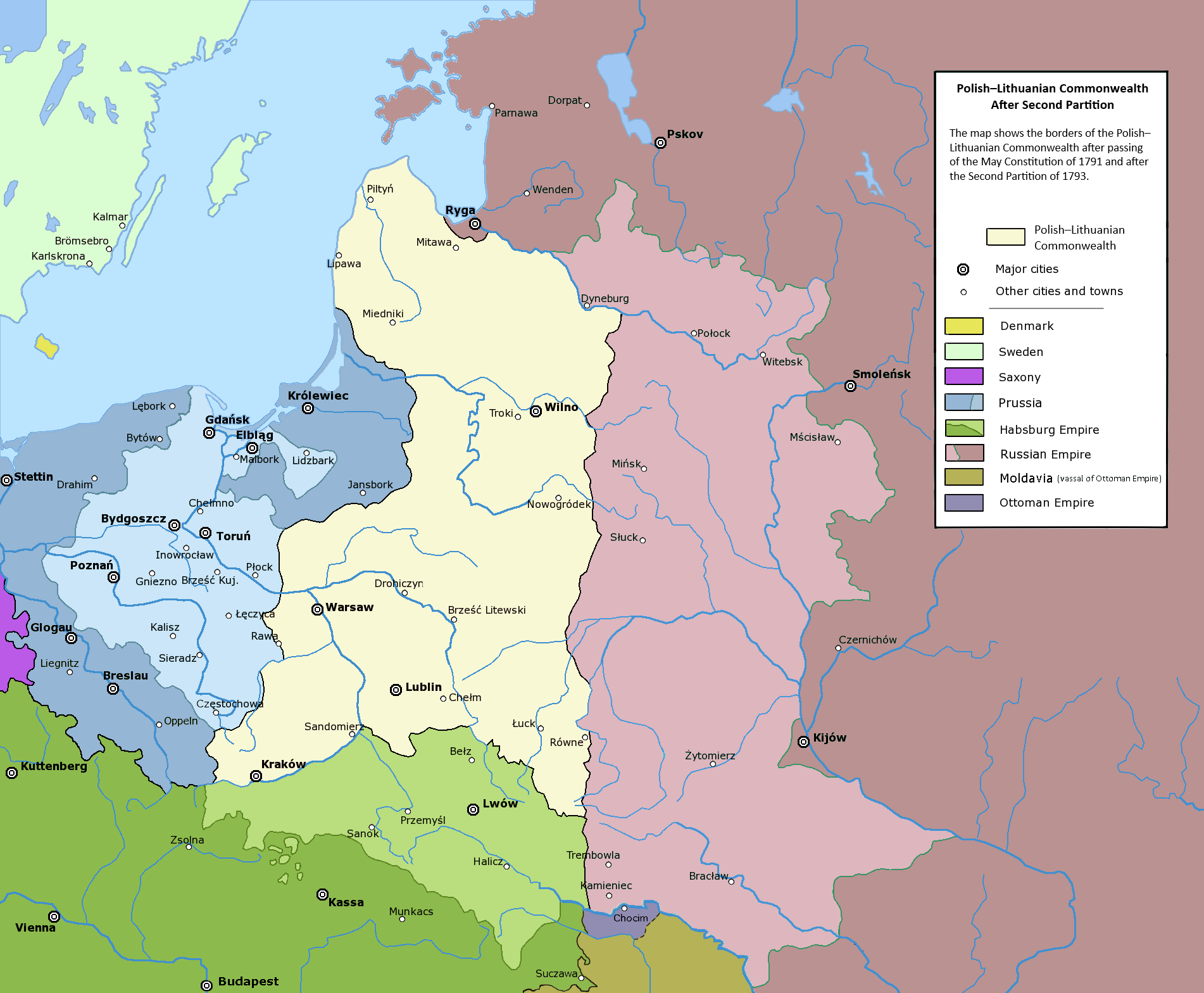
  Second Partition of Poland in 1793
- January 23 – Second Partition of Poland: The Russian Empire and the Kingdom of Prussia partition the Polish–Lithuanian Commonwealth.
- February – In Manchester, Vermont, the wife of a captain falls ill, probably with tuberculosis. Some locals believe that the cause of her illness is that a demon vampire is sucking her blood. As a cure, Timothy Mead burns the heart of a deceased person in front of a crowd of a few hundred people.
- February 1 – French Revolutionary Wars: The French First Republic declares war on Great Britain, the Dutch Republic and (on March 7) Spain. During the year, the War of the First Coalition is joined by Portugal, the Holy Roman Empire, Naples and Tuscany in opposition to France.
- February 11 – French expedition to Sardinia (Expédition de Sardaigne): A French fleet under admiral Laurent Truguet debarks troops near Cagliari in Sardinia.
- February 22 – French expedition to Sardinia: A small French and Corsican force briefly occupies the small Sardinian island of La Maddalena, then withdraws to Corsica. 23-year-old lieutenant Napoleon Buonaparte is second-in-command.
- February 25 – George Washington holds the first Cabinet meeting as President of the United States.
- February 27 – The Giles Resolutions are introduced to the United States House of Representatives, asking the House to condemn Alexander Hamilton's handling of loans.
- March 1–3 – John Langdon serves as President pro tempore of the United States Senate.
- March 4 – George Washington is sworn in as the president of the United States in Philadelphia, for his second term.
- March 5 – French troops are defeated by Austrian forces, and Liège is recaptured.
- March 18
  - Second Battle of Neerwinden: A coalition army of Habsburg monarchy and Dutch Republic troops repulses attacks from French Republican forces, near Neerwinden, Flemish Brabant.
  - The first republican state in Germany, the Republic of Mainz, is declared by Andreas Joseph Hofmann.
- April 6 – French Revolutionary Wars: The Committee of Public Safety is established in France, with Georges Danton as its head.
- April 9 – Edmond-Charles Genêt, France's new Minister to the United States, arrives at Charleston, South Carolina.
- April 22 – George Washington signs the Neutrality Proclamation.
- April 25 – The pioneer parishes of New Orleans and Louisiana are erected, as well as incorporated into the Roman Catholic Diocese of Louisiana and the Two Floridas.
- May 25 – French expedition to Sardinia: The last French troops occupying the small Sardinian island of San Pietro surrender to a Spanish fleet.
- May 31 – French Revolution: Regular troops under François Hanriot demand that the Girondins be expelled from the National Convention.
- June – The Macartney Embassy, a British diplomatic mission to China led by George Macartney, 1st Earl Macartney, reaches Canton, but will be rebuffed by the Qianlong Emperor.
- June 2 – French Revolution: The Girondins are overthrown in France.
- June 10 – French Revolution: The Jardin des Plantes and the Muséum national d'histoire naturelle are created by the National Convention. The museum opens in Paris the following year, and the garden houses one of the first public zoos.
- June 20–22 – Haitian Revolution: Battle of Cap-Français – French Republican troops and black slave insurgents defeat Royalist and slave owner settlers.
- June 21 – The town of Hamilton, Massachusetts, is incorporated.

=== July–December ===
- July 9 – The Act Against Slavery is passed in Upper Canada.
- July 13 – French Revolution: Charlotte Corday kills Jean-Paul Marat in his bath.
- July 17 – French Revolution: Charlotte Corday is executed.
- July 20 – Scottish explorer Alexander Mackenzie's 1792–1793 Peace River expedition to the Pacific Ocean reaches its goal at Bella Coola, British Columbia, making him the first known person to complete a transcontinental crossing of northern North America.
- July 29 – John Graves Simcoe decides to build a fort and settlement at Toronto, having sailed into the bay there.
- July 31 – Oulu Castle in Finland is destroyed in an explosion following the burning of a powder cellar.
- August – France decrees all the slaves on Saint-Domingue to be free.
- August 1–November 9 – The yellow fever epidemic of 1793 hits Philadelphia, Pennsylvania; 5,000 die.
- August 10 – French Revolution – Feast of Unity
  - Crowds in Paris burn monarchist emblems.
  - The Louvre in Paris opens to the public as an art museum.
- August 23 – French Revolution: The following universal conscription decree is enacted in France: "The young men shall go to battle and the married men shall forge arms. The women shall make tents and clothes and shall serve in the hospitals; children shall tear rags into lint. The old men will be guided to the public places of the cities to kindle the courage of the young warriors and to preach the unity of the Republic and the hatred of kings."
- September 5 – French Revolution: The National Convention begins the 10-month Reign of Terror.
- September 8 – The first Círio de Nazaré is celebrated in Belém.
- September 17 – The Army of the Eastern Pyrenees, one of the French Revolutionary armies, defeats a Spanish force at the Battle of Peyrestortes.
- September 18 – The cornerstone to the future United States Capitol is dedicated by U.S. President Washington at the site of the new Federal City on the Potomac River.
- September 20 – British troops from Jamaica land on the island of Saint-Domingue to join the Haitian Revolution in opposition to the French Republic and its newly-freed slaves; on 22 September the main French naval base on the island surrenders peacefully to the Royal Navy.
- October 5 – War of the First Coalition: Raid on Genoa – The British Royal Navy boards and captures French warships, sheltering in the neutral port of Genoa.
- October 15–16 – War of the First Coalition: Battle of Wattignies – A French Republican force commanded by Jean-Baptiste Jourdan compels a Habsburg Austrian Coalition army to retire.
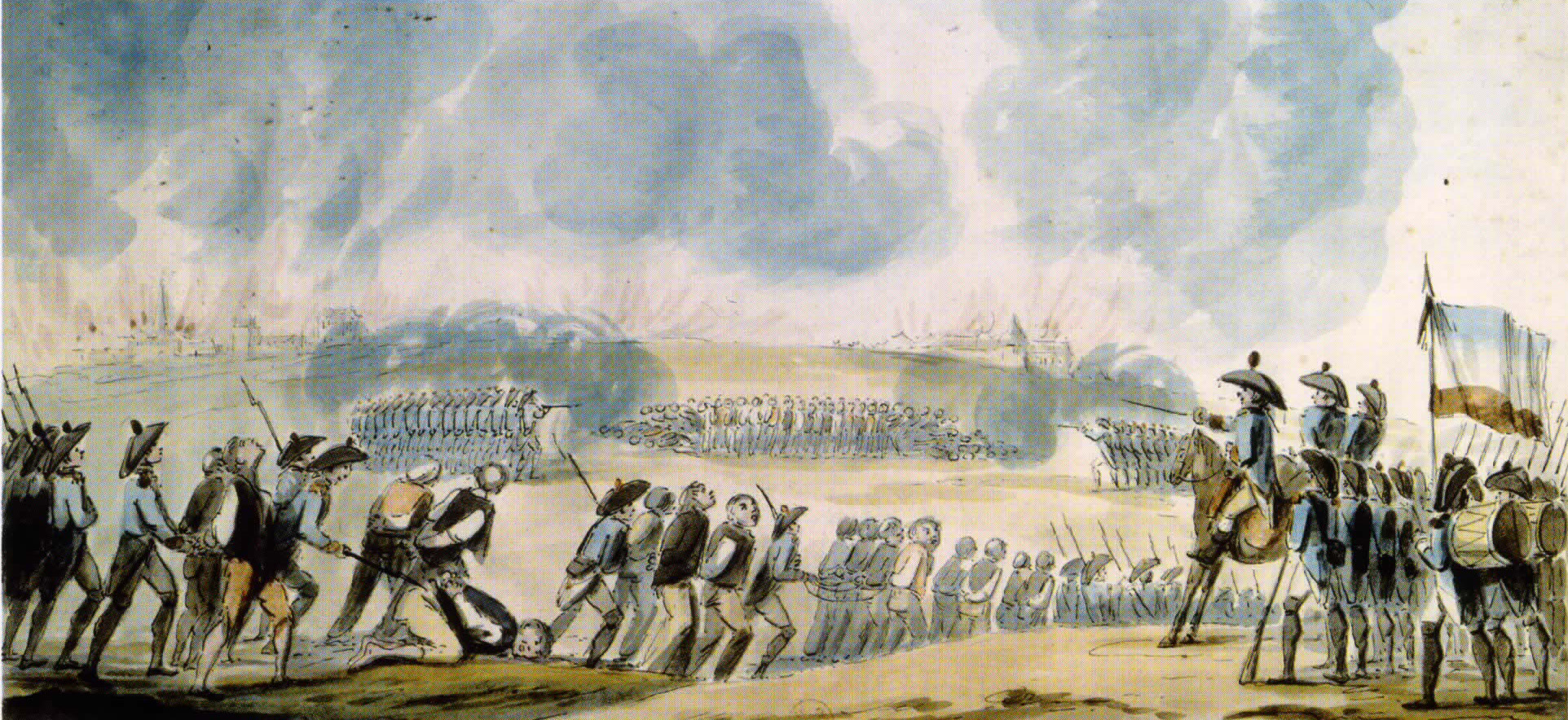
  Mass killings in the Vendée during the Reign of Terror in France
- October 16 – French Revolution: Marie Antoinette, the widowed queen consort of Louis XVI, is guillotined in the Place de la Révolution in Paris at the conclusion of a 2-day trial before the Revolutionary Tribunal.
- October 24 – French Revolution: The French Republican Calendar is adopted by the National Convention.
- November 10 – The dechristianization of France during the French Revolution reaches a climax with the celebration of the Goddess of Reason in the cathedral of Notre Dame de Paris.
- November 12 – French Revolution: Jean Sylvain Bailly, the first Mayor of Paris, is guillotined.
- December 8 – French Revolution: Madame du Barry is guillotined.
- December 9 – New York City's first daily newspaper, the American Minerva, is established by Noah Webster.
- December 18 – French forces under Dugommier capture Toulon from royalists and British forces under Vice Admiral Lord Hood. The British fire the dockyards and take 16 ships, one of which, the Lutine, becomes a famous treasure ship.
- December 23 – French Revolution: War in the Vendée: Battle of Savenay – A Republican force decisively defeats the counterrevolutionary Catholic and Royal Army, ending the Virée de Galerne.

=== Date unknown ===
- Eli Whitney invents a cotton gin. This causes a resurgence of slavery in the South.
- Lawrence Academy (Groton, Massachusetts) is chartered.
- Dominique Jean Larrey, chief surgeon of the French Revolutionary Army, creates the first battlefield "flying ambulance" service.
- The Al Bu Falah move to Abu Dhabi.
- The first year of regular production begins for the United States Mint, and the half cent is minted for the first time.
- Niccolò Paganini debuts as a violin virtuoso at age 11 in his birthplace of Genoa.

== Births ==
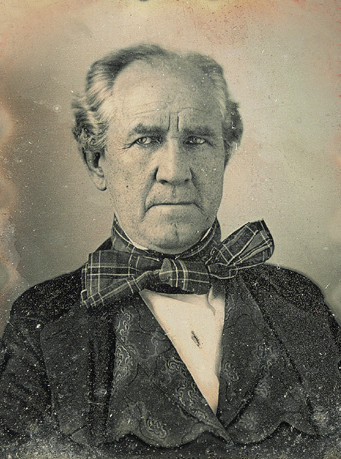
Sam Houston

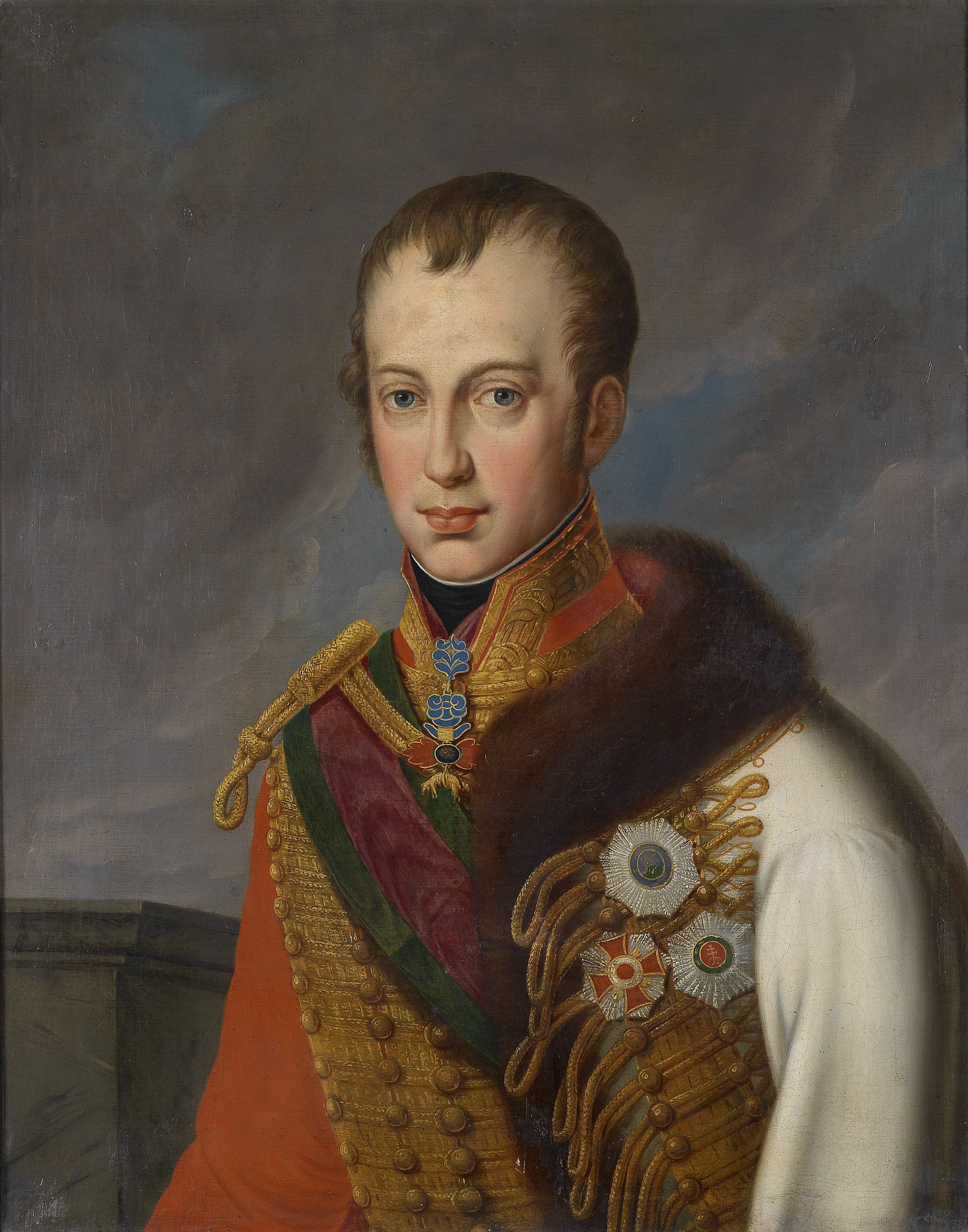
Ferdinand I of Austria

- January 3 – Lucretia Mott, American women's rights activist and abolitionist (d. 1880)
- January 11 – Johanna Stegen, German heroine (d. 1842)
- January 14 – Wojciech Chrzanowski, Polish general (d. 1861)
- March 2 – Sam Houston, American President of the Republic of Texas (d. 1863)
- March 3 – William Macready, English actor (d. 1873)
- March 4 – Karl Lachmann, German philologist (d. 1851)
- March 6 – William Dick, Scottish veterinarian, founder of Edinburgh Veterinary College (d. 1866)
- April 8 – Karl Ludwig Hencke, German astronomer (d. 1866)
- April 19 – Emperor Ferdinand I of Austria (d. 1875)
- June 6 – Edward C. Delavan, American temperance movement leader (d. 1871)
- June 29 – Josef Ressel, German-Bohemian inventor (d. 1857)
- July 13 – John Clare, English "peasant poet" (d. 1864)
- July 15 – Almira Hart Lincoln Phelps, American educator, scientist and writer (d. 1884)
- July 18 – Maria Caroline Gibert de Lametz, French stage actress, later Princess Consort and regent de facto of Monaco (d. 1879)
- July 20 – John Ireland Howe, American inventor (d. 1876)
- August 19 – Barthélemy Thimonnier, French inventor (d. 1857)
- August 25 – John Neal, American writer, critic, and women's rights activist (d. 1876)
- September 5 – John L. Burns, American veteran of the War of 1812, civilian combatant for the Union Army during the American Civil War. (d. 1872)
- September 25 – Felicia Hemans, British poet (d. 1835)
- November 3 – Stephen F. Austin, American pioneer (d. 1836)
- November 17 – Charles Lock Eastlake, English painter (d. 1865)
- Approximate date – Sarah Booth, English actress (d. 1867)

== Deaths ==
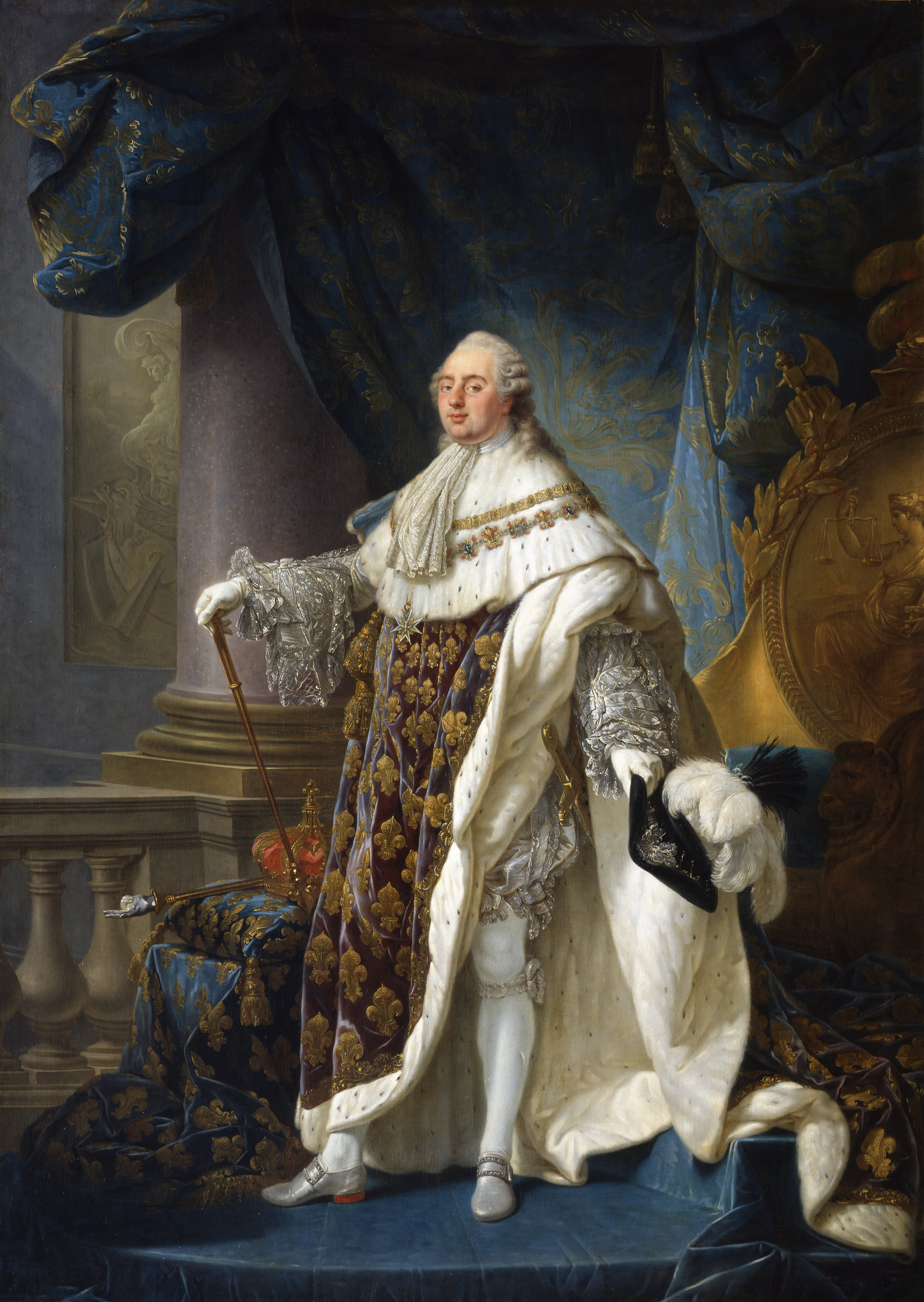
Louis XVI

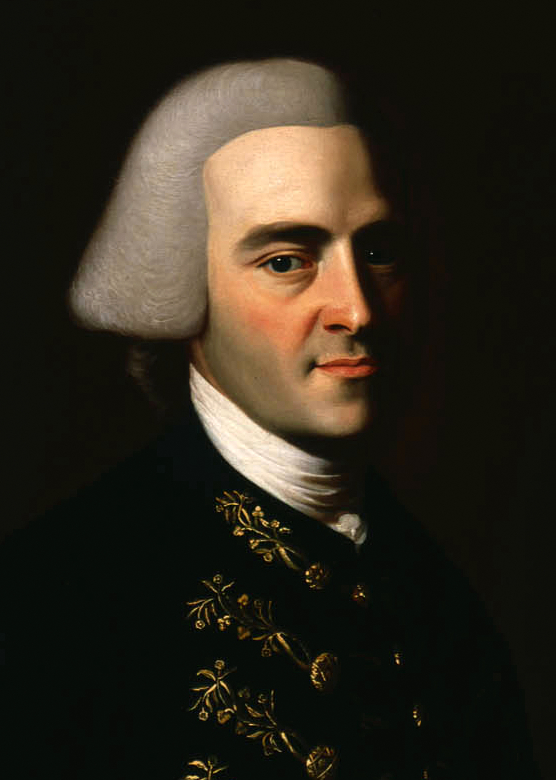
John Hancock

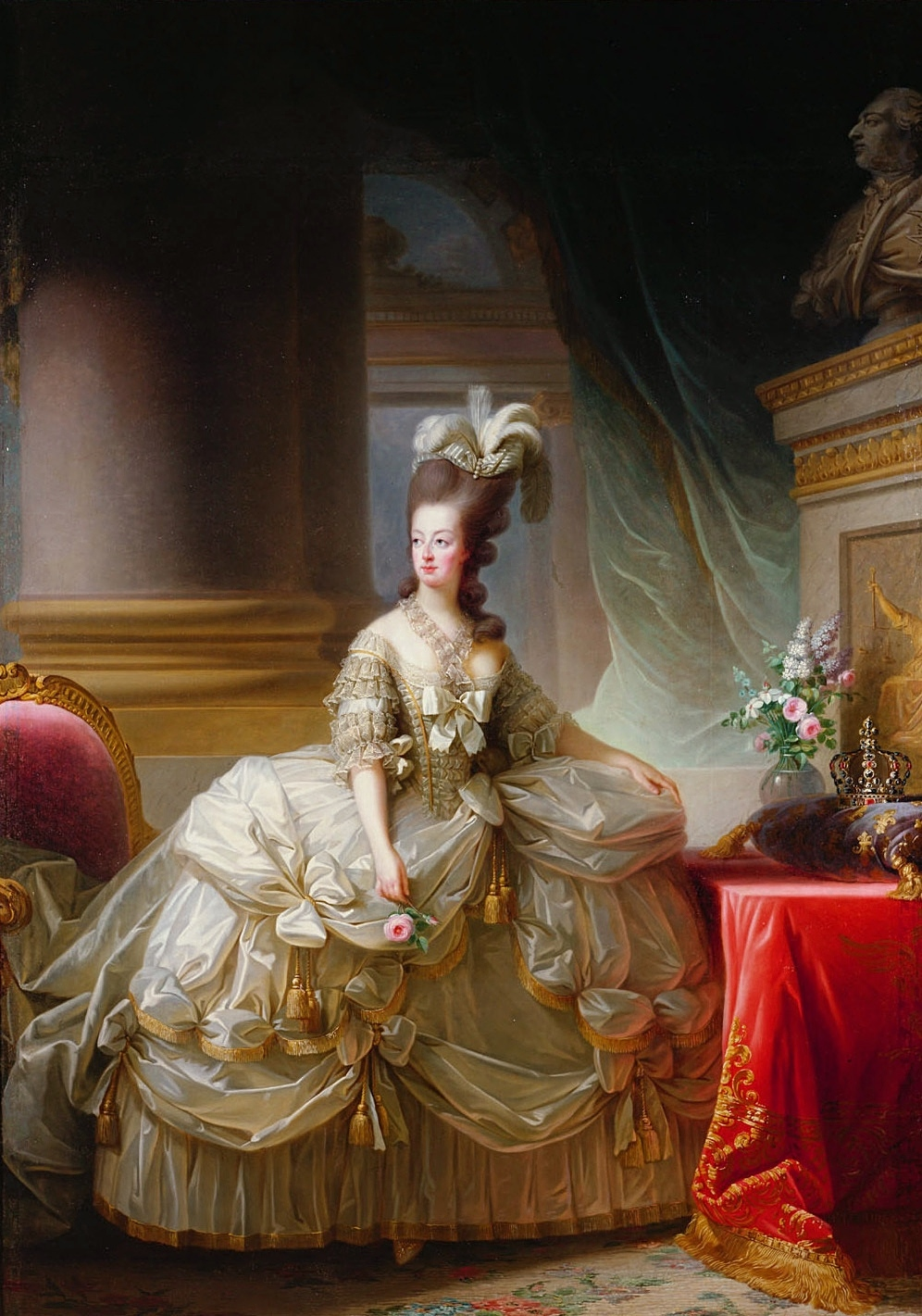
Marie Antoinette

- January 1 – Francesco Guardi, Italian painter (b. 1712)
- January 21 – King Louis XVI of France (executed) (b. 1754)
- February 1 – William Barrington, 2nd Viscount Barrington, British statesman (b. 1717)
- February 2 – Samuel Whittemore, American farmer and oldest known colonial combatant of the American Revolution (b. 1696)
- February 6 – Carlo Goldoni, Italian playwright (b. 1707)
- March 2 – Carl Gustaf Pilo, Swedish-born artist (b. 1711)
- March 4 – Louis Jean Marie de Bourbon, Duke of Penthièvre, French admiral (b. 1725)
- March 20 – William Murray, 1st Earl of Mansfield, Scottish judge, politician (b. 1705)
- March 26 – John Mudge, English physician, inventor (b. 1721)
- April 13 – Princess Marie Victoire d'Arenberg, Margravine of Baden-Baden as consort of Augustus George (b. 1714)
- April 15 – Ignacije Szentmartony, Croatian Jesuit missionary, geographer (b. 1718)
- April 29
  - Yechezkel Landau, Polish rabbi, Talmudist (b. 1713)
  - John Michell, English scientist (b. 1724)
- May 3 – Martin Gerbert, German theologian, historian (b. 1720)
- May 7 – Pietro Nardini, Italian composer (b. 1722)
- May 18 – Timur Shah Durrani, ruler of the Durrani Empire (b. 1748)
- May 20 – Charles Bonnet, Swiss naturalist (b. 1720)
- May 26 – Eliza Lucas, American agronomist (b. 1722)
- June 26 – Gilbert White, English ornithologist (b. 1720)
- July 13 – Jean-Paul Marat, Swiss-born French Revolutionary leader (assassinated) (b. 1743)
- July 17 – Charlotte Corday, French assassin of Jean-Paul Marat (executed) (b. 1768)
- July 23 – Roger Sherman, American lawyer, signer of the Declaration of Independence (b. 1721)
- July 26 – Alessandro Besozzi, Italian composer (b. 1702)
- August 22
  - Louis de Noailles, French peer and Marshal of France (b. 1713)
  - John Thomas, Dean of Westminster; Bishop of Rochester (b. 1712)
- August 28 – Adam Philippe, Comte de Custine, French general (executed) (b. 1740)
- September 17 – George Handley, American politician (b. 1752)
- September 20 – Fletcher Christian, English sailor (b. 1764)
- October 7
  - Wills Hill, 1st Marquess of Downshire, English politician (b. 1718)
  - Antoine Joseph Gorsas, French publicist, politician (executed) (b. 1752)
- October 8 – John Hancock, American businessman and patriot, signer of the Declaration of Independence (b. 1737)
- October 9 – Jean Joseph Marie Amiot, French Jesuit missionary (b. 1718)
- October 16 – Marie-Antoinette, Queen Consort of France (executed) (b. 1755)
- October 31
  - Pierre Victurnien Vergniaud, French revolutionary leader (executed) (b. 1744)
  - Claude Fauchet, French revolutionary leader (executed) (b. 1754)
  - Armand Gensonné, French revolutionary leader (executed) (b. 1758)
  - Jacques Pierre Brissot, French revolutionary leader (executed) (b. 1754)
- November 3 – Olympe de Gouges, French playwright (executed) (b. 1748)
- November 6 – Louis Philippe II, Duke of Orléans, French noble, revolutionary leader (executed) (b. 1747)
- November 8 – Madame Roland, French Revolutionary hostess (executed) (b. 1754)
- November 10 – Jean-Marie Roland, vicomte de la Platière, French revolutionary leader (suicide) (b. 1734)
- November 12 – Jean Sylvain Bailly, French astronomer (b. 1736)
- November 14 – Caterina Dolfin, Italian (Venetian) poet (b. 1736)
- November 24 – Clément Charles François de Laverdy, French statesman (executed) (b. 1723)
- November 29 – Antoine Barnave, French revolutionary leader (executed) (b. 1761)
- December 4 – Armand de Kersaint, French revolutionary leader (executed) (b. 1742)
- December 5 – Jean-Paul Rabaut Saint-Étienne French revolutionary leader (executed) (b. 1743)
- December 6 – Sir John Dashwood-King, 3rd Baronet, English country gentleman (b. 1716)
- December 7 – Joseph Bara, French Revolution child-hero (b. 1780)
- December 8
  - Étienne Clavière, French financier, politician (suicide) (b. 1735)
  - Madame du Barry, French courtesan (executed) (b. 1743)
- date unknown – Im Yunjidang, Korean scholar, writer and neo-Confucian philosopher (b. 1721)
