= Jean Simon =

Jean Simon may refer to:

- Jean Simon (cyclist), Belgian racing cyclist
- Jean Simon (bowls), Guernsey lawn bowler
- Jean Henri Simon, Belgian engraver and soldier
