= Conrad Tanner =

Swiss Benedictine Abbot of Einsiedeln

Conrad Tanner (28 December 1752 at Arth in the Canton of Schwyz – 7 April 1825) was a Swiss Benedictine Abbot of Einsiedeln.

== Life ==
He studied the classics and theology at Einsiedeln; made vows in the Order of St. Benedict on 8 September 1772, and was ordained in May 1777. He was engaged as teacher at the gymnasium of Einsiedeln and later at Bellinzona. In 1787, he held the position of librarian at his abbey, and in 1789, he was made director of the college at Bellinzona.

During the French Revolution, Tanner fled to the Tyrol, taking with him the miraculous statue, the head of St. Meinrad, and other valuables, and remained there until he could restore the treasures to the abbey. He was appointed pastor of St. Gerold in Vorarlberg in 1802, where he remained for three years, until recalled to act as master of novices.

At the death of Abbot Beat in 1808, Tanner was elected abbot. He prudently accommodated himself to the political situation, and thus secured the existence of the monastery. He encouraged the pursuit of studies, renovated the buildings, and rebuilt the Holy Chapel which had been destroyed 1798 by the French. Although the village of Einsiedeln was no longer under his jurisdiction, he retained for it a solicitude which he showed in the years of famine (1816 and 1817).

It was the intention of Pope Pius VII to create the new Diocese of Waldstätten out of the cantons Uri, Schwyz, and Unterwalden, to make Tanner bishop, and to constitute the monks of Einsiedeln as cathedral chapter. The matter was proposed in 1818, but was declined by the abbot and his capitulars.

== Works ==
Tanner's writings are:

- Betrachtungen zur sittlichen Aufklärung im neunzehnten Jahrhundert (5 vols., Augsburg, 1804–1808)
- Bildung des Geistlichen durch Geistesübungen (Augsburg, 1807), of which a fifth edition appeared at Einsiedeln in 1846

His pedagogical works were published by his successor as abbot, Celestine Müller.
