= Philippe-André Grandidier =

French priest and historian

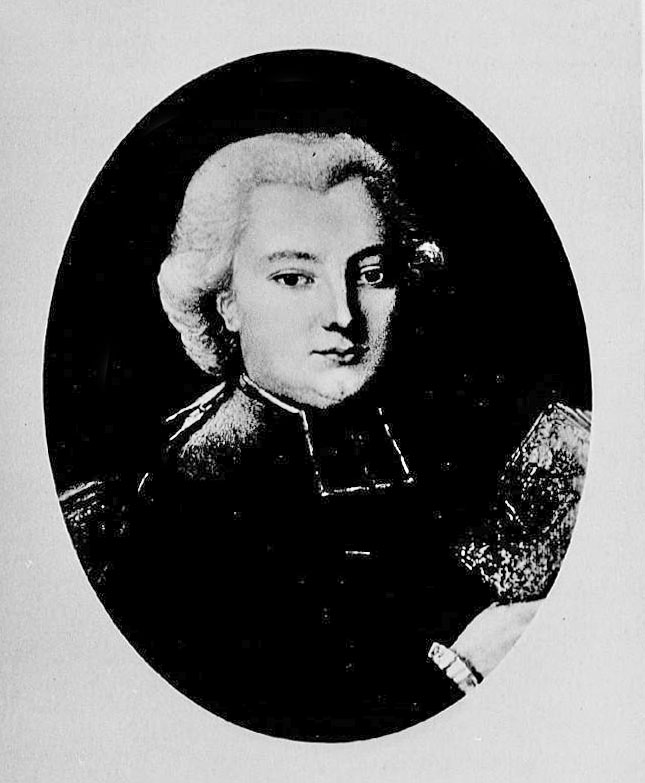
Philippe-Andre Grandidier

Philippe-Andre Grandidier (29 November 1752 – 11 October 1787) was an 18th-century French priest and historian.

== Life ==
A gifted scholar from Strasbourg, Alsace, he was appointed archivist of the Diocese of Strasbourg at the early age of eighteen by the prince-archbishop, Cardinal de Rohan, and at twenty-five had been admitted to twenty-one scientific societies in France and the Holy Roman Empire. In recognition of his services he was made Canon of Strasbourg, and, shortly before his death, historiographer royal for Alsace. His forte was critical investigation, but his intense application soon undermined his health, and he died at the early age of thirty-four at Lucelle Abbey in the Sundgau.

== Works ==
He wrote two volumes of the Histoire de l'église et des évêques-princes de Strasbourg depuis la fondation de l'évêché jusqu'à nos jours (Strasbourg, 1776–78), an account of the early ecclesiastical history of Alsace to 965 CE. From the manuscripts of Grandidier, Liblin continued this monumental work under the title: Oeuvres historiques inédites de Ph.-A. Grandidier (Colmar, 1865–67), in six volumes. Pius VI expressed his admiration of Grandidier's work and encouraged the young man to further labours. The other canons of Strasbourg, feeling slighted, opposed Grandidier's scientific methods, even questioning the soundness of his faith, and for a while he dropped all historical work. He soon yielded, however, to his love of science, and gave new evidence of his interest in historical research by the Essais historiques et topographiques sur l'église cathedrale de Strasbourg (Strasbourg, 1782) and by the Histoire ecclésiastique, militaire, civile et littéraire de la province d'Alsace (Strasbourg, 1787). P. Ingold edited in five volumes the correspondence of this savant: Nouvelles oeuvres inédites; Les Correspondants de Grandidier (Paris, 1895–97).
