= Claude-Augustin Tercier =

French general (1752–1823)

- Born: 8 November 1752; Philippeville
- Died: 24 February 1823 (aged 70)
- Allegiance: Kingdom of France; Armée des émigrés Chouan; Kingdom of France
- Rank: Maréchal de camp
- Commands: Vaiges division
- Conflicts: American Revolutionary War, Chouannerie (Quiberon)

Claude-Augustin [de] Tercier de Vaduens (8 November 1752, Philippeville – 24 February 1823) was a French Royalist general during the Chouannerie, heading the chouans in the la Charnie forest, commanding the Vaiges division. His father, originally from the Canton of Fribourg, was a captain of grenadiers in the La Tour-du-Pin regiment.
