= John Austin (inventor) =

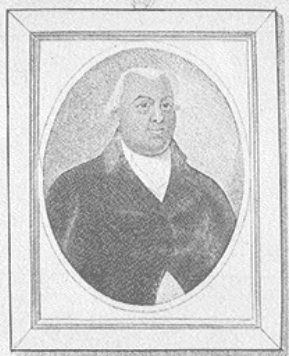
John Austin (1752-1830) portrayed by John Kay

John Austin (17 April 1752 – 1830), was a Scottish inventor, known for inventing musical equipment, improvements to weaving machines, and a new system of stenography.

Austin was a native of Craigton near Glasgow, where is father was gardener to John Baird Esq. He was an apprentice to William and Walter Tait in Glasgow, and became a guild brother on 18 January 1776.

He published at Glasgow, in or about 1800, a system of Stenography which may be learned in an hour, on a single folio engraved sheet, price 2s. 6d. A note at the end announces the publication of a complete system by the same author, price one guinea, but this does not appear to have been issued.

He was also the author of an elaborate work entitled A System of Stenographic Music, invented by J. Austin, Glasgow. Dedicated to the Musical World, in English, French, Italian, German, and other Languages, (Glasgow, 50 engraved pages, oblong folio, no date, c. 1802). On the title-page is an engraved portrait of the author, who states in the preface that 'the design of this work is to represent to the musical world a new, easy, concise, and universal method of writing music completely on one line only, and adapted to all kinds of vocal and instrumental music and musical instruments, whereby an expert writer may note it down as he hears it performed, so that to those who make it their amusement or profession it will be equally interesting, together with the pleasure of improving and profiting by the art,' and, in conclusion, he remarks that 'if the shorthand writer is pleased in taking from the mouth of an orator, the musical stenographer will be no less so when catching those dulcet sounds which vibrate through the soul, convincing her that she is more than mortal.' According to a review in The Scots Magazine (lxv, 1803, p. 165), the system was taught in several boarding schools near Edinburgh, in addition to Herriot and Watson's Hospital.

Another publication about a musical invention, Tonometer (London, c. 1800), describes a mechanical aid for transposition and tuning using movable brass wheels.

In 1806 Austin turned his attention to the improvement of weaving machines, creating a steam-powered loom and other improvements.

He died in Glasgow in 1830.
