= Joseph Malboeuf, dit Beausoleil =

Canadian politician

Joseph Malboeuf, dit Beausoleil (March 11, 1752 – December 27, 1823) was a farmer, blacksmith and political figure in Lower Canada. He represented Effingham in the Legislative Assembly of Lower Canada from 1810 to 1820. His name also appears as Joseph Malboeuf.

He was born Joseph-Maxime Malboeuf, dit Beausoleil in Sainte-Famille on the île d'Orléans, the son of Joseph Malboeuf dit Beausoleil and Reine Morin. He was married twice: first to Catherine Comparet in 1776 and then to Louise Lorain in 1816. Malboeuf dit Beausoleil did not run for reelection in 1820. He died in Terrebonne at the age of 71.
