= Michael Hughes (priest) =

17th-century Welsh Anglican priest

Michael Hughes was a Welsh Anglican priest in the 17th century.

Hughes was educated at Brasenose College, Oxford, England. He held livings at Usk in Monmouth, 1633, sinecure rector of Llandyssil in Montgomeryshire, and vicar of Chirk, and Llandudno. He was appointed archdeacon of Merioneth in 1676, a post he held until his death in 1680.
