= Michael Hughes (industrialist) =

Welsh industrialist

Michael Hughes (13 May 1752 – 2 May 1825) was a Welsh industrialist best known for his role in the copper mining industry.

Hughes was born at Lleiniog, near Beaumaris, Anglesey. At the height of his prosperity, he was manager of the Stanley and Ravenhead smelting works in Lancashire, as well as a partner in the Parys Mountain copper mine and the Flintshire-based Greenfield Copper and Brass Company. He also had an interest in both the Amlwch Shipping Company and the Amlwch Brewery Company. He made his home at Sherdley House in Prescot, Lancashire, which he built between 1803 and 1806. He was Deputy-Lieutenant of Lancashire.

== Sources ==
- Welsh Biography Online
- J. R. Harris - "The Sherdley Papers", Transactions of the Hist. Soc. of Lancs. and Cheshire, 1950
