= Antoine Joseph Gorsas =

French publicist and politician (1752 – 1793)

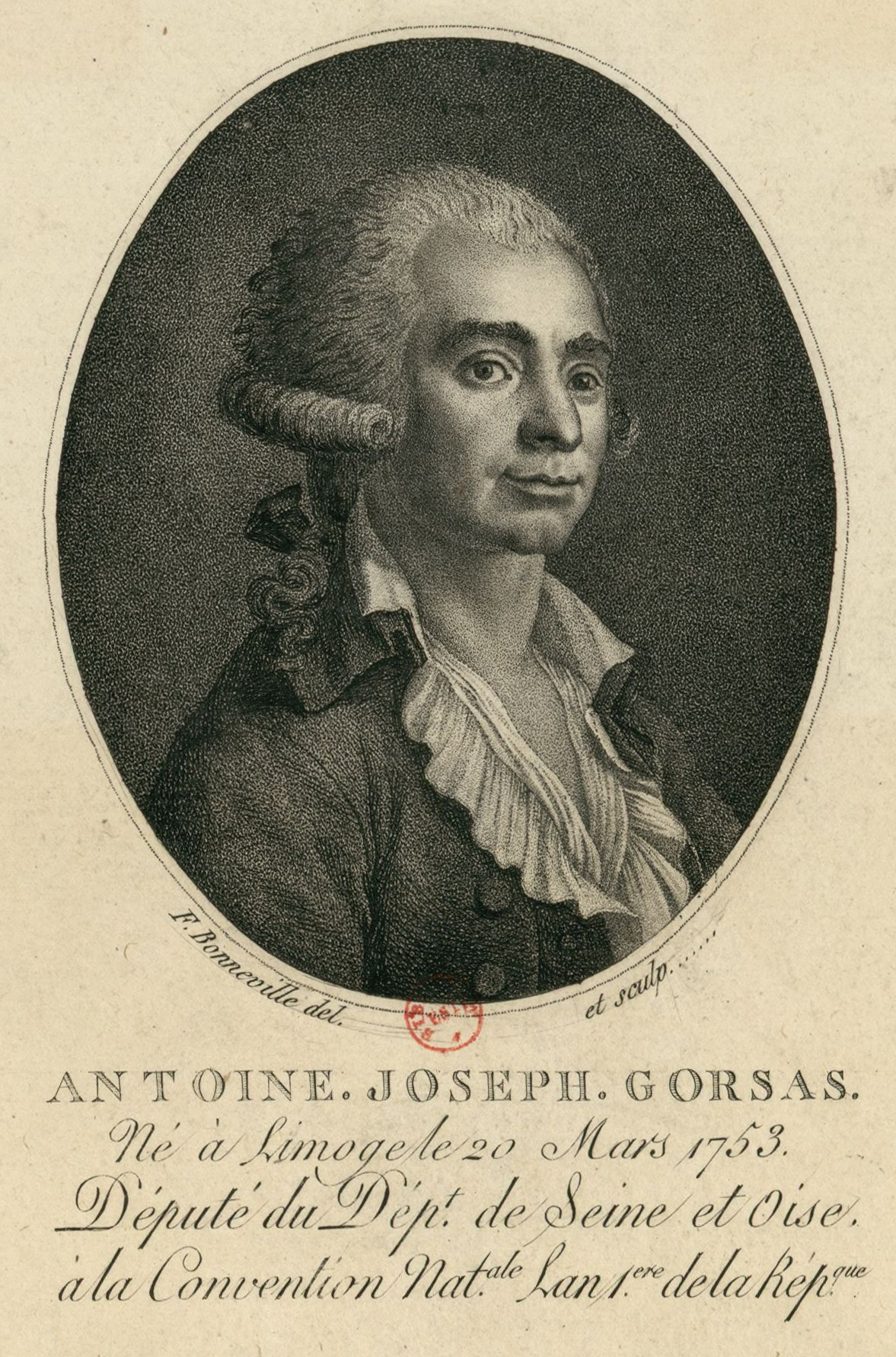
- Born: 24 March 1752; Limoges (France)
- Died: 7 October 1793 (aged 41); Paris (France) (guillotined)
- Known for: Newspapers: Courrier de Versailles à Paris et de Paris a Versailles; Courrier des quatre-vingt-trois départements
- Scientific career
- Fields: Publicist

Antoine Joseph Gorsas (24 March 1752 – 7 October 1793) was a French publicist and politician.

== Biography ==
Gorsas was born at Limoges (Haute-Vienne), the son of a shoemaker. He established himself as a private tutor in Paris, and presently set up a school for the army at Versailles, which was attended by commoners as well as nobles. In 1781 he was imprisoned for a short time in the Bicêtre on an accusation of corrupting the morals of his pupils, his real offence being the writing of satirical verse.

These circumstances explain the violence of his anti-monarchical sentiment. At the opening of the states-general he began to publish the Courrier de Versailles à Paris et de Paris a Versailles, in which appeared, on 4 October 1789, the account of the banquet of the royal bodyguard. Gorsas is said to have himself read it in public at the Palais Royal, and to have headed one of the columns that marched on Versailles.

He then changed the name of his paper to the Courrier des quatre-vingt-trois départements, continuing his incendiary propaganda, which had no small share in provoking the popular insurrections of June and August 1792. During the September massacres he wrote in his paper that the prisons were the centre of an anti-national conspiracy and that the people exercised a just vengeance on the guilty.

On 10 September 1792 he was elected to the convention for the department of Seine-et-Oise, and on 20 January 1793 was elected one of its secretaries. He sat at first with the Mountain, but having been long associated with Roland and Brissot, his agreement with the Girondists became gradually more pronounced; during the trial of Louis XVI he dissociated himself more and more from the principles of the Mountain, and he voted for the king's detention during the war and subsequent banishment.

A violent attack on Marat in the Courrier led to an armed raid on his printing establishment on 9 March 1793. The place was sacked, but Gorsas escaped the popular fury by flight. The facts being reported to the convention, little sympathy was shown to Gorsas, and a resolution (which was evaded) was passed forbidding representatives to occupy themselves with journalism. On 2 June he was ordered by the convention to hold himself under arrest with other members of his party.

He escaped to Normandy to join Buzot, and after the defeat of the Girondists at Pacy-sur-Eure he found shelter in Brittany. He returned from Renees to Paris in the autumn en route to Limoges his hometown but was arrested in the Palais-Royal on the 6th of October. At the hearing he was prevented from speaking in his defense and was likewise prevented from speaking or even make gestures as he was taken to be guillotined the next day.

== Works ==
- 1786 – L'âne promeneur, ou, Critès promené par son âne. Chef-d'oeuvre pour servir d'apologie au goût, aux moeurs, à l'esprit, et aux découvertes du siècle
- 1788 – Le grand-bailliage, comédie historique, en trois actes et en prose. Représentée à Rouen, depuis le 8 mai 1788 jusqu'au 9 octobre de la même année, par une troupe de baladins, qui a été sifflée par tous les bons citoyens
- 1789 – Déclaration du sieur Gorsas au sujet des lettres de Beaumarchais, citées dans la cause de M. Kornmann
- 1791 – Procès de Monsieur le Curé de Saint Sulpice: au tribunal de l'opinion publique, ou Lettre adressée à l'auteur du Courrie[r] de Paris dans les quatre-vingt-trois départemens
- 1791 – Sentence rendue contre l'un des plus respectables citoyens de la capitale, en faveur de Charles-Henri Sanson, bourreau de Paris. Suivie de la rétractation du honorable citoyen. Extrait du Courrier de Paris dans les prov. no VIII
- 1792 – Le Courrier des LXXXIII départemens. II Législature. Tome XI
- 1792 – Epître à mon collègue et bon ami Marat
- 1793 – Précis rapide des événemens qui ont eu lieu a Paris dans les journées des 30 et 31 mai, premier et 2 juin 1793
- 1794 – Précis rapide des évènemens qui ont eu lieu à Paris dans les journées des 30 et 31 mai, premier et 2 juin 1793
