= Jean Henri Simon =

Belgian engraver and soldier (1752–1834)

Jean Henri Simon (28 October 1752 – 12 March 1834) was a Belgian engraver and soldier.

== Life ==
Simon was born in Brussels then part of the Austrian Netherlands. He was a son of the engraver Jacob Simon, under whom he learned his trade. When not quite fifteen years of age he was appointed engraver to Prince Charles Alexander of Lorraine. In 1775 he removed to Paris, where he became engraver to the Duke of Orleans in Chartres, with a yearly salary of 200 thaler. He soon became engraver to King Louis XVI, which position he held until 1792.

At the beginning of French Revolutionary Wars, Simon commanded a company under General Charles François Dumouriez. The battles of Anderlecht and Boucar, in both of which he was wounded, won him the rank of lieutenant-colonel. Returning to Paris, as a follower of Dumouriez he was accused of treason when the latter went over to the enemy, but he succeeded in proving himself innocent. He next went to Spain, where he became engraver to the court, but was soon recalled to Paris as teacher of engraving at the Institute for Deaf-Mutes. After being banished for a short period, he was recalled and became engraver to the empress Josephine. In 1813 he rejoined the army, and served as colonel of a regiment of lancers in the first corps of the francs-éclaireurs of the department of the Seine. Discharged on half-pay in 1814, he took no prominent part in the campaign of 1815, and in 1816 he went to Brussels, where he passed the rest of his life.

== Works ==
Simon was an excellent engraver; he executed engravings on precious stones, some of which were mistaken for real antiques and were sold to the Empress of Russia. He likewise etched on copper, and his portraits of noted men of the Netherlands especially deserve mention. He also published L'Armorial général de l'Empire, of which only volumes 1 and 2 appeared, under the patronage of the empress Josephine. Among his pupils were Dubois, Paul, Verger, Lalondre, and his own son Simon.

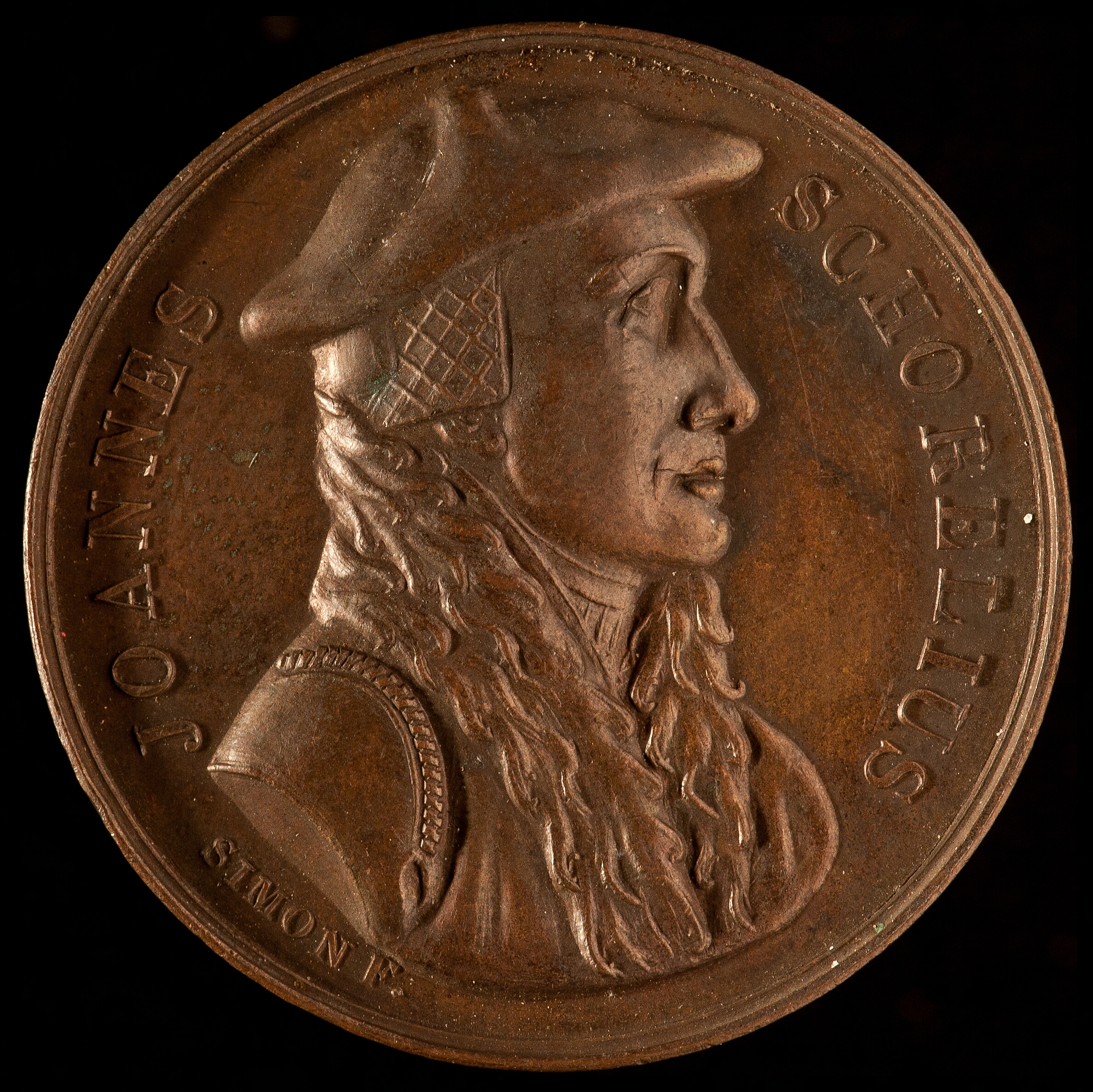
Jan van Scorel (1820s)

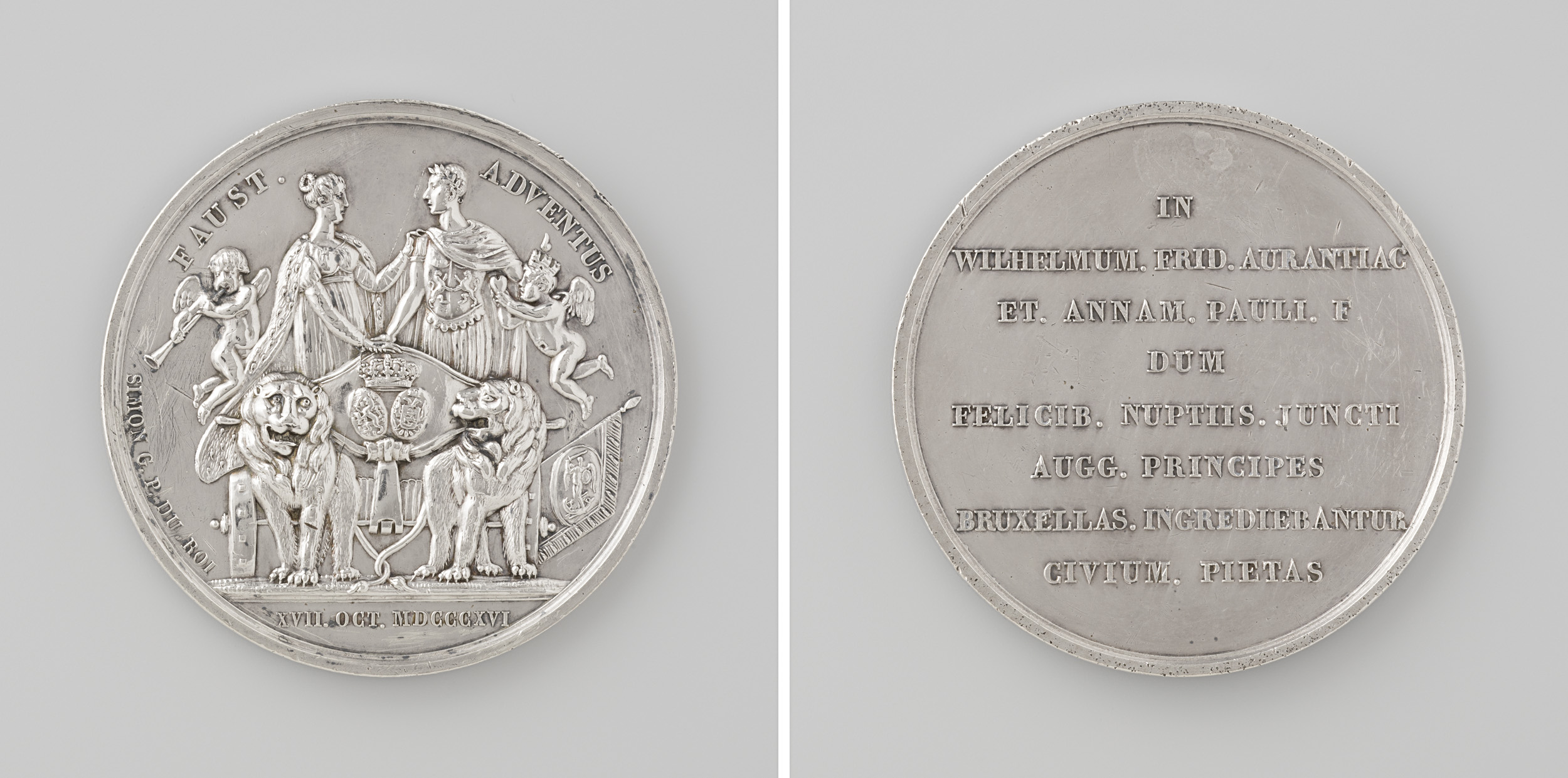
Arrival of William II and Anna Paulowna in the Netherlands

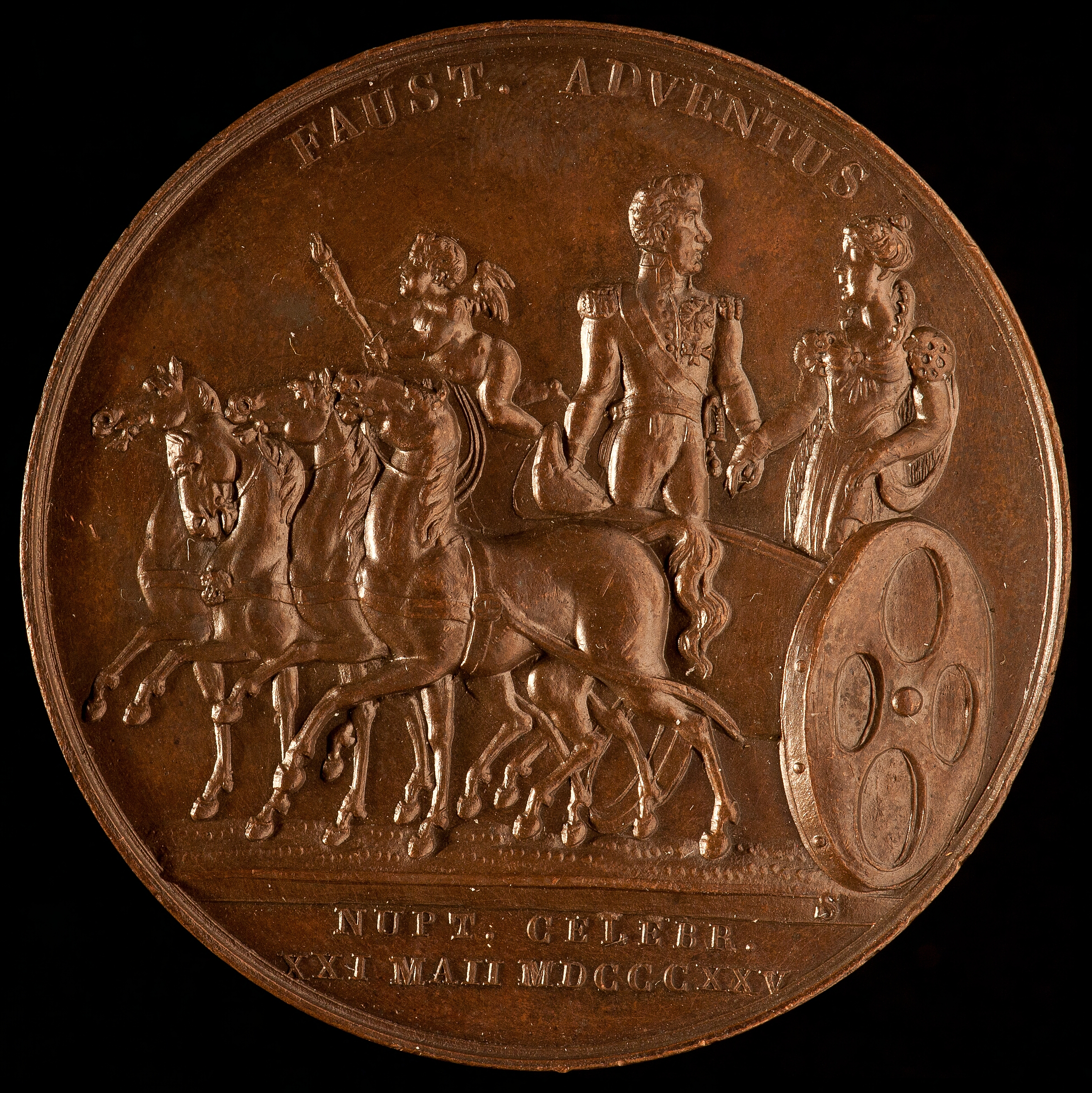
Marriage of Prince Frederick and Louise of Prussia (1825)

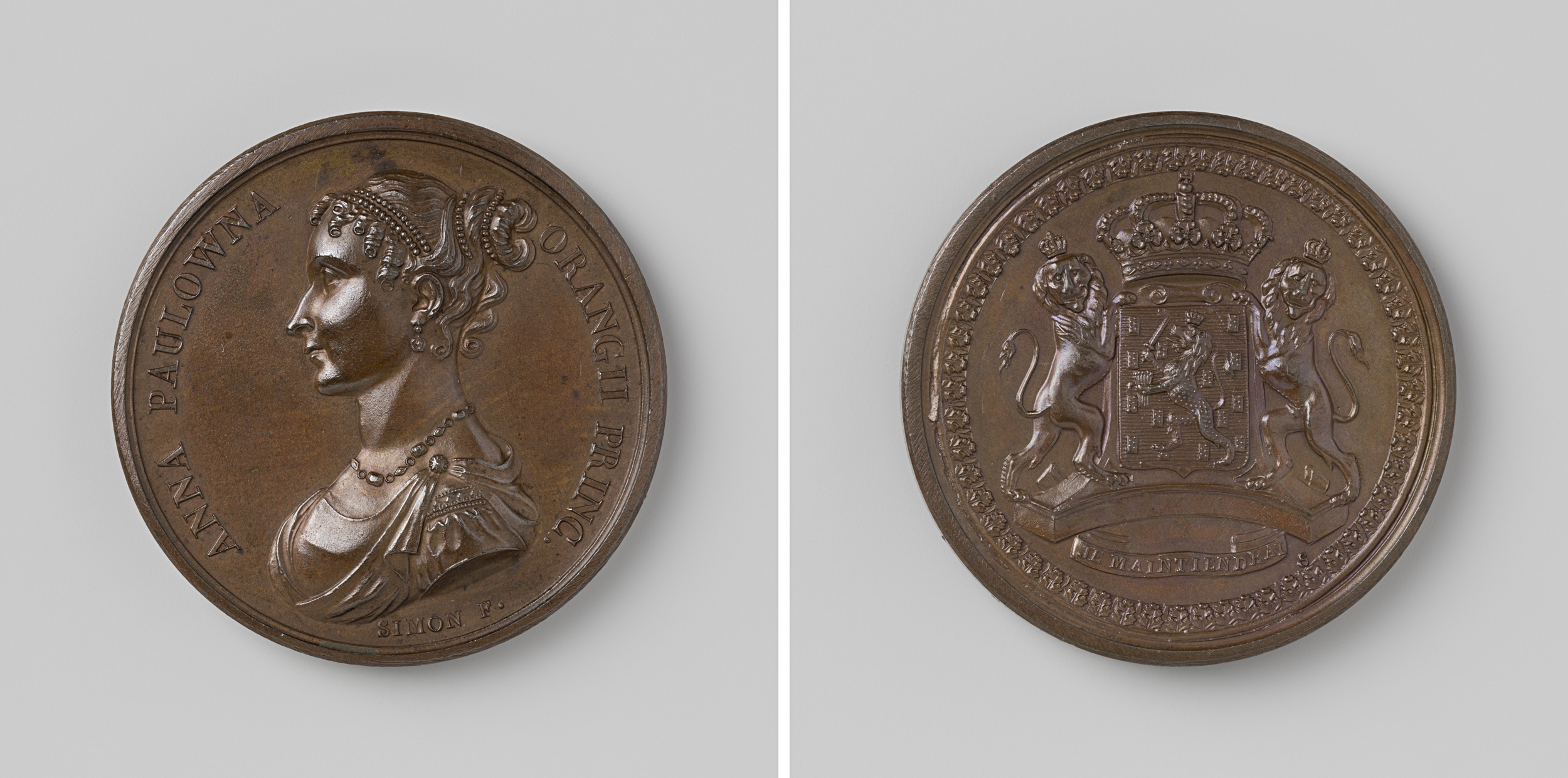
Anna Paulowna

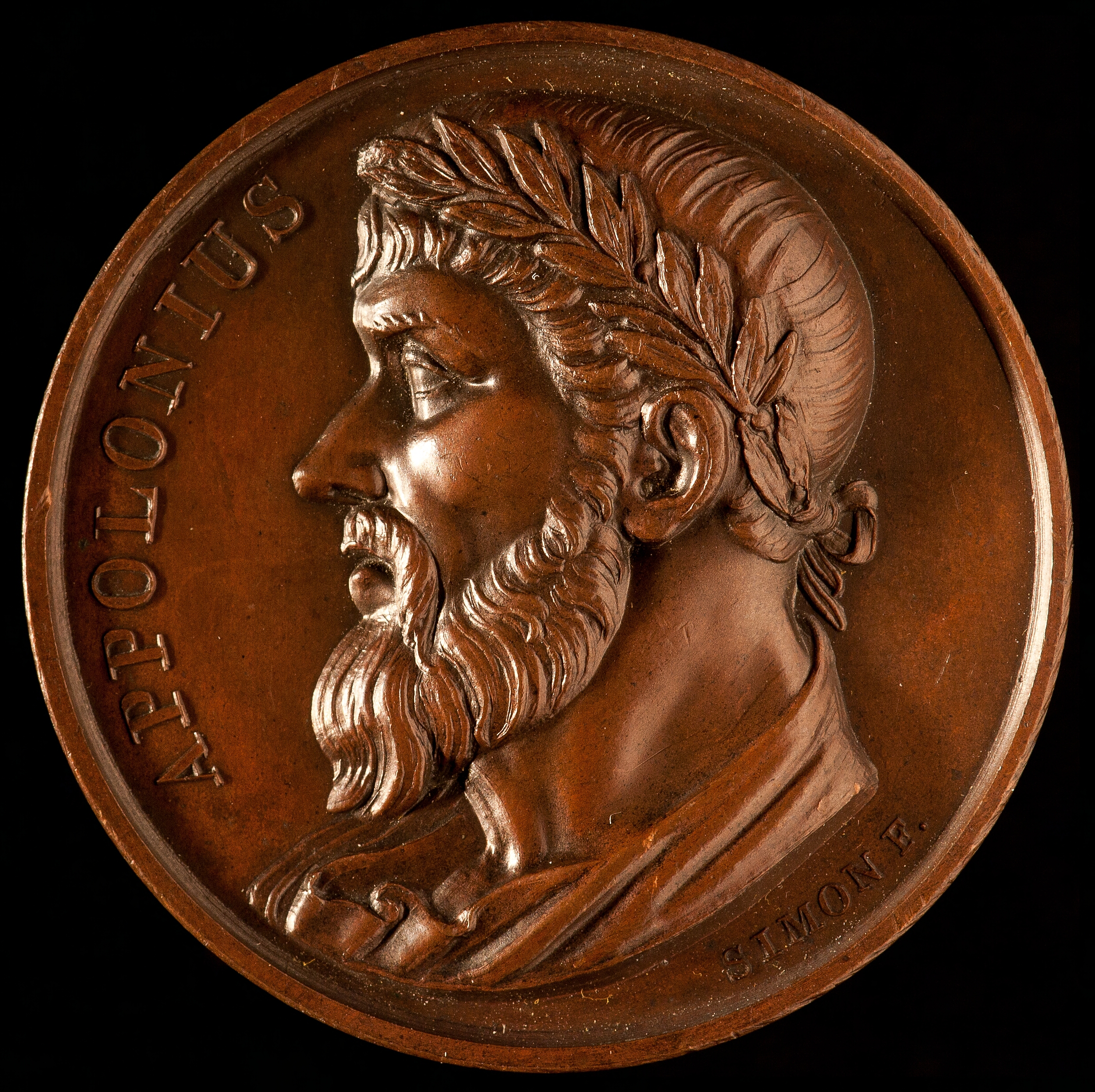
Apollonius Rhodius (1820s)

== Sources ==
- Allgemeine Zeitung des Judenthums, 1841, pp. 694 et seq., 710 et seq.S. F. T. H.
