= Edward Hughes =

Edward or Ned Hughes may refer to:

== Arts and entertainment ==
- Edward Hughes (artist) (1832–1908), English painter
- Edward Robert Hughes (1851–1914), English painter
- Edward Ellis Hughes (1940–2017), American painter

== Law and politics ==
- Edward Hughes (MP) (died 1734), British politician
- Edward Hughes (trade unionist) (1856–1925), Welsh trade unionist
- Edward J. Hughes (1888–1944), American politician
- Edward Burton Hughes (1905–1987), New York State official
- Edward J. Hughes Jr. (fl. 1970s), American politician in the New Jersey Senate

== Religion ==
- Edward Hughes (poet) (1772–1850), Welsh poet and clergyman
- Edward Hughes (exorcist) (1918–1980), Catholic priest
- Edward Hughes (bishop) (1920–2012), American bishop

== Others ==
- Sir Edward Hughes (Royal Navy officer) (c. 1720–1794)
- Edward Hughes Ball Hughes (1798–1863), English dandy; inheritor of Admiral Edward Hughes' fortune
- Edward Hughes (sailor) (fl. 1824–1825), English ship's master for whom Hughes Bay, Antarctica, is named
- Edward Merritt Hughes (1850–1903), United States Navy officer during the Spanish–American War
- Edward Ernest Hughes (1877–1953), Welsh historian
- Ned Hughes (1881–1928), New Zealand rugby player
- Edward David Hughes (1906–1963), British chemist
- Sir Edward Hughes (surgeon) (1919–1998), Australian colorectal surgeon

== Other uses ==
- Sir Edward Hughes (1784 EIC ship)

== See also ==
- Ed Hughes (disambiguation)
- Eddie Hughes (disambiguation)
- Ted Hughes (disambiguation)
- Hughes (surname)
