= Cadfan =

Cadfan or St Cadfan might refer to:

- The Battle of Cadfan, fought between English and Welsh armies in 1257
- Cadfan ap Iago, King of Gwynedd (7th century floruit)
- John Cadvan Davies (1846–1923), Archdruid of Wales, used the bardic name Cadfan
- Saint Cadfan, founder of a monastery on Bardsey Island (6th century or 7th century floruit)
  - St Cadfan's Church, Tywyn in Mid Wales
  - The Cadfan Stone in the above church
- St. Cadfan, a diesel locomotive on the Talyllyn Railway
