= Ysgol Uwchradd Tywyn =

Location
- Station Road; Tywyn, Gwynedd, LL36 9EU; Wales; 52°35′05″N 4°05′22″W

Information
- Type: State school
- Established: 1894; 132 years ago
- Head Teacher: David Thorp
- Teaching staff: 25.5 (2023)
- Gender: Co-educational
- Age: 11 to 16
- Enrolment: 393 (2024)
- Language: Bilingual (Type A)
- Houses: Cadfan, Dysynni and Maethlon
- Website: www.tywyn.gwynedd.sch.uk

Ysgol Uwchradd Tywyn is a bilingual coeducational secondary school for pupils aged between 11 and 16 years. It is situated in Tywyn, Gwynedd.

As of 2018, around 19% of pupils come from Welsh-speaking homes.

== History ==
It was opened as 'Towyn Intermediate School' in 1894 in a building called Brynarfor (formerly a private school called the Towyn Academy and then Brynarvor Hall School). Brynarfor was demolished in 2008.

In 2015, the Welsh Government declared it the secondary school with the highest standards in Wales, as defined by its school categorisation system.

== Feeder schools ==
The following primary schools feed (or fed) Ysgol Uwchradd Tywyn:

- Ysgol Craig y Deryn (from 2013)
- Ysgol Gynradd Aberdyfi (before closure in 2013)
- Ysgol Gynradd Abergynolwyn (before closure in 2010)
- Ysgol Gynradd Aberllefenni (before closure in 1967)
- Ysgol Gynradd Bryncrug (before closure in 2013)
- Ysgol Gynradd Dyffryn Dulas, Corris
- Ysgol Gynradd Llanegryn (before closure in 2013)
- Ysgol Gynradd Llwyngwril (before closure in 2013)
- Ysgol Gynradd Pantperthog (before closure in 1960s)
- Ysgol Gynradd Pennal
- Ysgol Gynradd Penybryn
- Ysgol Gynradd Tynyberth, Corris Uchaf (before closure in 1967)

== Notable former pupils ==
- Tom Bradshaw (b.1992), Welsh international footballer
- Geraint Goodwin (1903–41), author of The Heyday in the Blood (1936)
- Rhodri Jones (b. 1991), Wales international rugby union player
- Lord Prys-Davies (1923–2017) of Llanegryn
- Michael Raven (1938–2008), author, musician, composer and poet

== Notable former teachers ==
- Thomas Richards (1878-1962), historian
- David Williams (1900-1978), historian
- Ifan Ywain, guitarist
