= Arthur ap Huw =

- Occupation: Translator
- Writing career
- Period: c. 1555-1570

Arthur ap Huw (fl. 1555–1570), also known as Arthur Hughes, was a clergyman, patron of Welsh poets, and a translator of religious literature into Welsh.

He was a grandson of Hywel ap Siencyn ab Iorwerth (d. 1494) of Ynysymaengwyn and was vicar of St Cadfan's Church in Tywyn between 1555 and his death in 1570. He was a notable patron of Welsh poets. He is also known for his translation into Welsh of George Marshall's counter-Reformation text A Compendious Treatise in Metre (1554).

His nephew was David Johns (sometimes known as Dafydd Johns, David Jones or David ap John, fl. 1572-98), another important figure in the Welsh Renaissance.
