= Corbett Arms Hotel =

Grade II listed building in Gwynedd, Wales

Coordinates: 52.5877°N 4.0829°W

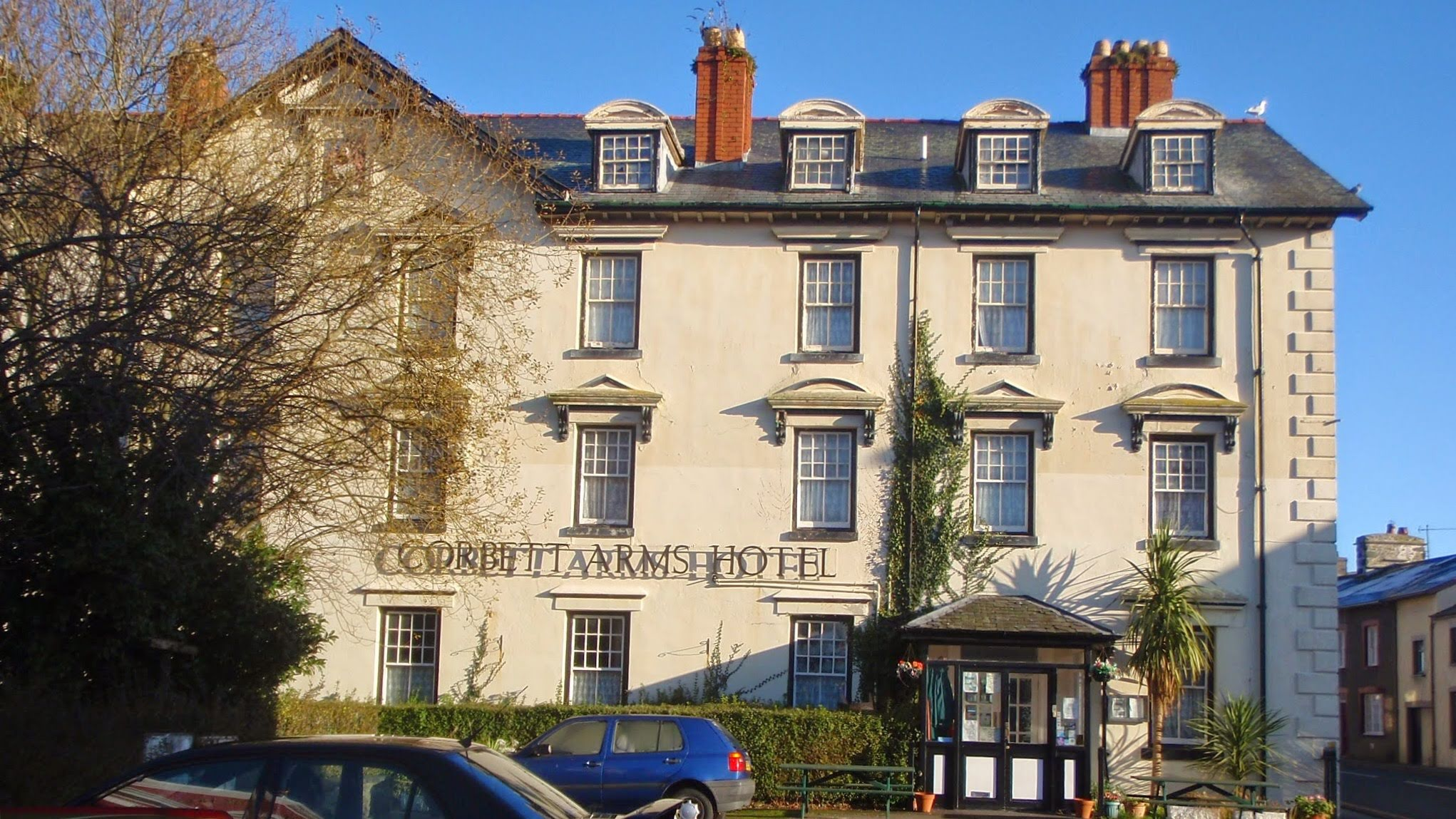
Front side of Corbett Arms

Corbett Arms Hotel is a Grade II listed building on Corbett Square Tywyn, Gwynedd. The building is located at one end of the Tywyn High Street near the recently (2010) refurbished Tywyn Cinema, The Magic Lantern.

The hotel, formerly known as the Corbet Arms or the Corbet and Raven Arms, was the principal hotel in Tywyn and is first recorded in 1833. It was part of the Ynysmaengwyn estate which was bought by John Corbett in 1878. Corbett added a second 't' to the hotel's name and, around the year 1900, more than doubled the building in size.

The hotel is in a late Georgian style, three stories high and attic with a slate roof. It has been listed Grade II by Cadw since the 1970s.

Famous celebrities that have stayed at the hotel include John Lennon and Yoko Ono who holidayed here with their children Sean and Julian in the summer of 1969.

The hotel has been abandoned since 2011. The condition of the hotel has deteriorated in recent years, and following recent collapses the council has applied for listed building consent to demolish the building for public safety.
