= Llanfendigaid Estate =

Grade II* listed building in Gwynedd, Wales

Coordinates: 52.6237°N 4.1176°W

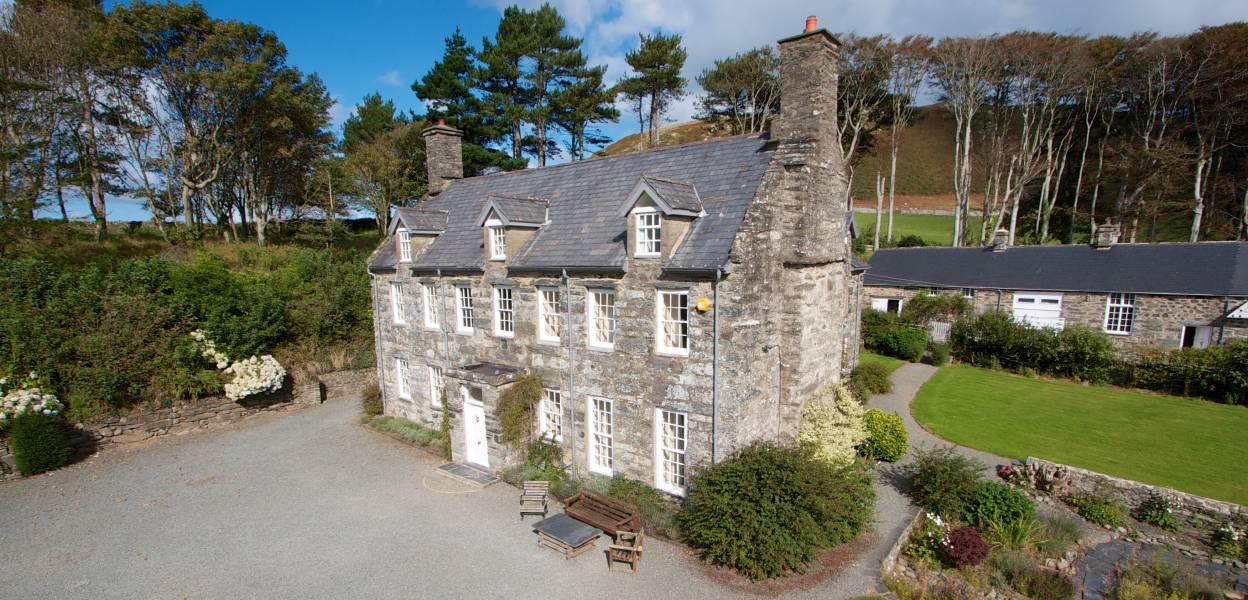
Llanfendigaid with Stable Cottage and Dove Cottage at the back

Llanfendigaid Estate, located on the Cardigan Bay coast of southern Gwynedd (formerly Merioneth: Welsh: Meirionnydd, Sir Feirionydd), near Tywyn in north Wales, is a mid-Georgian house that has belonged to the same family for over 600 years. Llanfendigaid is listed Grade II* by Cadw, a rating given only to houses of exceptional historic interest. The estate once encompassed over 16,000 acres (65 km^{2}), is now reduced to 16 acres (0.065 km^{2}) within the Snowdonia National Park.

== History ==
A word borrowed from Welsh: Llanfendigaid, its name translates as Parish of the Blessed. The Nanney-Wynn family and their ancestors have occupied the lands of Llanfendigaid since it was first recorded in approximately 1241. The main house was built in the 13th century, and was renovated to its present design in 1746. John Nanney married the Anwyl heiress in the early 17th century. Hence the family is related to Evan Vaughan Anwyl, who descends from Owain Gwynedd.

Listing the home for sale in 2021, the former army officer Will Garton-Jones is the last of 40 generations of the Wynn-Nanney family to own the house, The estate has an asking price of £2m.
