= Llanegryn =

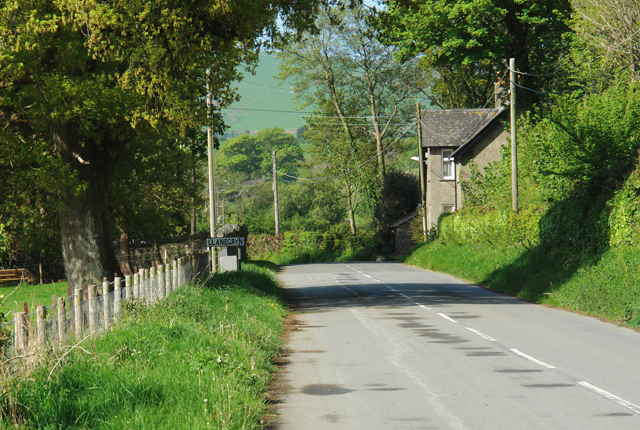
- Lower road into Llanegryn in 2009

- Location within Gwynedd
- Population: 303
- OS grid reference: SH600054
- Community: Llanegryn
- Principal area: Gwynedd
- Preserved county: Gwynedd
- Country: Wales
- Sovereign state: United Kingdom
- Post town: TYWYN
- Postcode district: LL36
- Dialling code: 01654
- Police: North Wales
- Fire: North Wales
- Ambulance: Welsh
- UK Parliament: Dwyfor Meirionnydd
- Senedd Cymru – Welsh Parliament: Dwyfor Meirionnydd
- List of places UK Wales Gwynedd 52.628°N 4.068°W Map of the community

Llanegryn is a village and a community in Gwynedd, North West Wales. It was formerly part of the historic county of Merionethshire (Welsh: Meirionnydd, Sir Feirionnydd). It is located within Snowdonia (Eryri) national park, south of the mountain range of the same name. Travelling by road, it is around 4 miles (6 km) north-east of Tywyn and 17 miles (27 km) south-west of Dolgellau. The nearest railway stations are at Tonfanau and Llwyngwril, both less than 3 miles (5 km) away.

Llanegryn is named for St Egryn, with llan meaning church or parish – a common feature in Welsh place names. The village lies in the Dysynni Valley (Dyffryn Dysynni).

== History of the area ==
The Dysynni Valley, originally a river delta of the Afon Dysynni, was largely drained from the late 1700s on – notably by the Corbet family at Ynysymaengwyn – creating a flat, fertile valley, several miles in width. There is likely to have been much earlier settlement on surrounding high ground for sheep rearing and agriculture. An Iron Age fort is located towards the east end of the valley.

The village's Methodist chapel was built in 1811, enlarged in 1848 and rebuilt 30 years later in the simple Gothic style with gable entry.

Samuel Lewis's 1833 Topographical Dictionary of Wales records 764 inhabitants in Llanegryn, also noting the free school founded in 1650. The 1868 National gazetteer lists the parish population as 652 in 149 houses.

=== Llanegryn Church ===
There has been a recorded settlement around St Mary and St Egryn church at Llanegryn since the 13th century, with the first record of the church being in 1253/4. This notable medieval Grade I listed building contains a fine carved rood screen, dating from about 1520 – considered to be among the finest in Wales. It has been suggested this may come from Cymer Abbey. It also contains a 12th-century font and a surviving medieval window on the north wall of the nave, although the church underwent substantial restoration during the 19th century.

=== Peniarth Estate ===
To the east of the village stands the Peniarth Estate. In the 19th century, the house was the home of William Watkin Edward Wynne. A wealthy antiquarian, Wynne inherited and augmented a collection of historic Welsh manuscripts, the Peniarth Manuscripts, which is now held by the National Library of Wales and considered its most important such collection. The house is a Grade II* listed building and its gardens are designated, also at Grade II* on the Cadw/ICOMOS Register of Parks and Gardens of Special Historic Interest in Wales.

== The village today ==
Today, the population of Llanegryn is approximately 300, including outlying houses and farms. Primary sources of income are farming and tourism, with several caravan parks being located throughout the Dysynni valley, particularly on the Peniarth estate. The village attracts hikers and walkers, due to its location near to Cadair Idris mountain (Cader Idris in the local Welsh language) and Craig yr Aderyn (meaning "Bird Rock"), which is notable as an inland site where cormorants breed. Other local landmarks include Castell y Bere, constructed by Llywelyn the Great in the 1220s.

The village has one school: Ysgol Craig y Deryn, a Welsh-medium primary school. In 2024, over 39 per cent of pupils came from Welsh-speaking homes.

== Transport ==
Buses are run by Lloyd’s Coaches. The services run to surrounding town’s and villages.

== Notable people ==
- Hugh Owen (ca.1639 – 1700), a Welsh independent minister.
- Edward Anwyl (1786–1857), a Welsh Wesleyan minister and school teacher, born in Ty'nllan
- Meredydd Evans (1919–2015), singer, TV producer, academic, Welsh-language activist, music collector and editor
- Gwilym Prys Davies, Baron Prys-Davies (1923–2017), a Welsh Labour politician
- Ifan Davies (born ca.1980), singer and guitarist with Sŵnami & Yws Gwynedd
