= Hugh Owen (minister) =

Welsh Independent minister

Hugh Owen (1639 or 1640 – 15 March 1700) was a Welsh independent minister.

== Life ==
Owen (the great-grandson of John Lewis Owen, Member of Parliament for Merioneth in 1572) was educated at Jesus College, Oxford, matriculating in 1660. He left the university without taking a degree. Edmund Calamy recorded that Owen was a candidate for the ministry in August 1662 and that Owen, after travelling from Oxford to London, soon returned to Wales. Owen was an itinerant preacher in Merioneth, Caernarvonshire and Montgomeryshire. He obtained a license as a congregational teacher in 1672, working from his house in Llangegry in Merioneth. Later the same year, he was given licenses to preach in various locations in Merioneth (Bodwenni, Cynfal, Erwgoyel, Llanegryn, and Peniarth). In 1675, he was ordained as a minister in the Independent church based at Wrexham.

His grandson later stated that Owen had been imprisoned in Powis Castle by William Herbert, 1st Marquess of Powis, a Catholic, but that Lord Powis had treated Owen well, having been impressed by Owen's prayers, and invited him to return to Powis Castle every Christmas after his release.

In 1685, Owen became the minister of a congregation comprising Independents and Baptists at Ysgafell (near Newtown) in Montgomeryshire. He died on 15 March 1700 and was survived by his wife, Martha, whom he had married in or before 1670. They had a son (John Owen, to whom Hugh Owen left his books in Hebrew, Greek and Latin) and three daughters. Owen was buried in the churchyard at Llanegryn. John Owen himself died three months later on 27 June 1700.
