= Ted Hughes (disambiguation) =

Ted Hughes (1930–1998) was an English poet.

Ted Hughes may also refer to:

- Ted Hughes (footballer) (1876–1936), Welsh footballer
- Ted Hughes (judge) (1927–2020), Canadian judge

== See also ==
- Teddy Hughes (disambiguation)
- Edward Hughes (disambiguation)
