= Teddy Hughes =

Teddy Hughes may refer to:

- Teddy Hughes, As the World Turns character played by Kerr Smith
- Teddy Hughes, in 1919–20 Manchester City F.C. season

== See also ==
- Ted Hughes (disambiguation)
