= Afon Dyffryn Gwyn =

River in Gwynedd, Wales

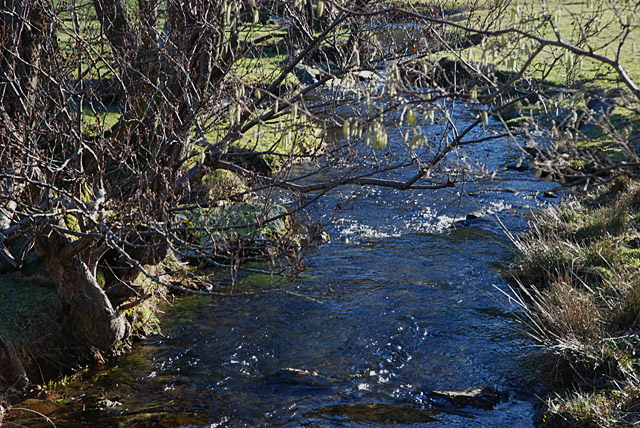

Location
- Country: Wales
- Region: Gwynedd

Physical characteristics
- Source
  - location: Cwm Maethlon
- Mouth
  - location: Abernewydd, Penllyn, Tywyn (Cardigan Bay)
  - coordinates: 52°34′25″N 4°05′35″W

Afon Dyffryn Gwyn is a river in Gwynedd, north-west Wales. Its source is on Trum Gelli above Cwm Maethlon (also known as Dyffryn Gwyn and Happy Valley). It flows in a south-westerly direction through Cwm Maethlon and reaches the sea near Penllyn farm, south of Tywyn. It was formerly sometimes known as Caethle Brook.

Until the 1860s the river flowed into a lake called Llyn y Borth (or Penllyn Pool) just prior to reaching the sea. Both the river and the lake (on which small boats could be launched) were noted for their trout before lead mining in Cwm Maethlon in the 1850s polluted the water.

The river's estuary was altered in the early nineteenth century as part of drainage works. Following this the reformed mouth of the river became known as Abernewydd (literally, 'new estuary').

In 1862 further drainage works associated with building of the Aberystwith and Welsh Coast Railway straightened the river's course, drained Llyn y Borth, and effectively removed the estuary. Since then, the river reaches the Cardigan Bay via an outflow pipe.
