= Tywyn =

Small coastal town in Gwynedd, Wales

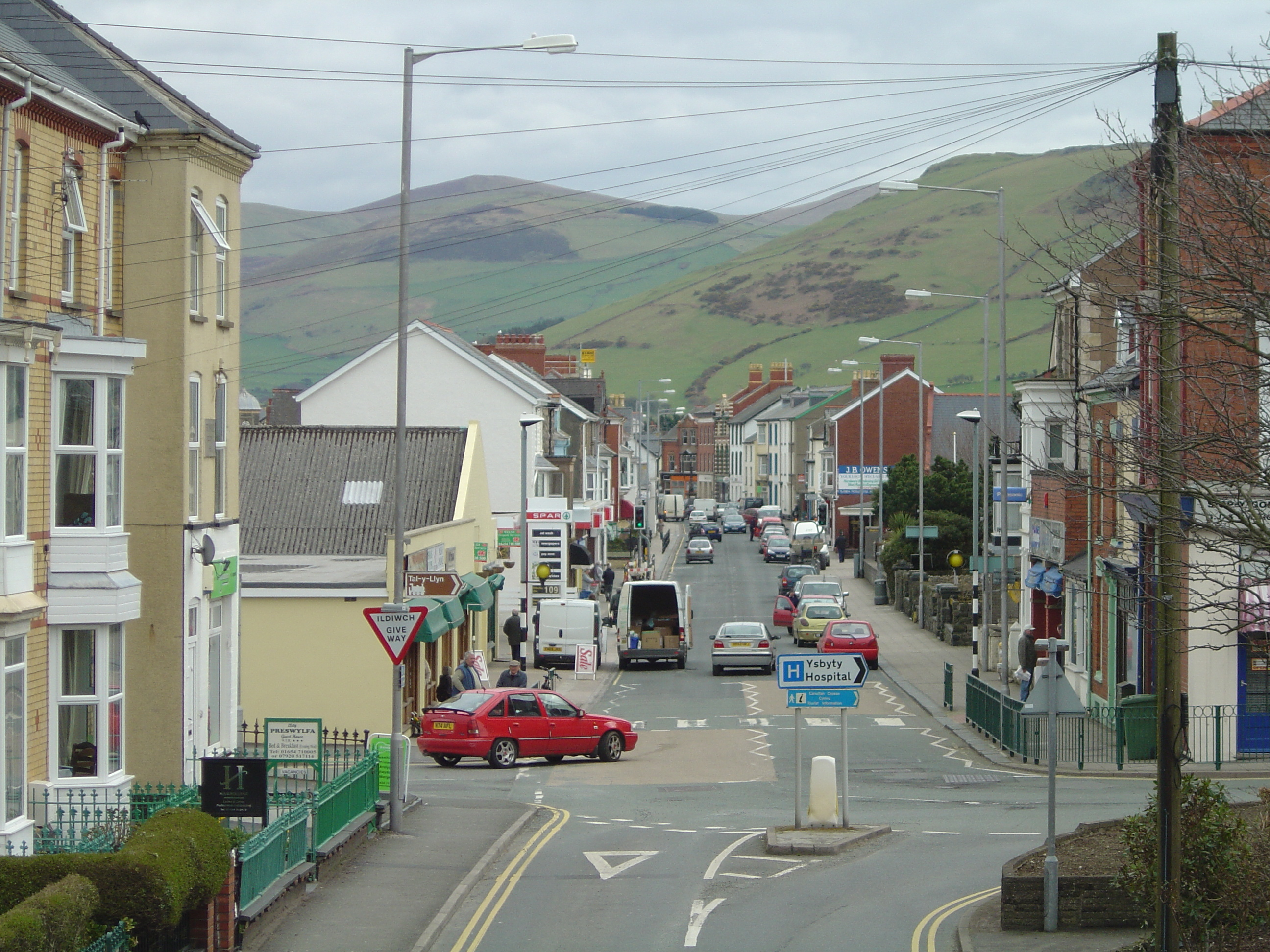
- Tywyn High Street

- Flag

- Location within Gwynedd
- Population: 3,133
- OS grid reference: SH585004
- Community: Tywyn
- Principal area: Gwynedd
- Preserved county: Gwynedd
- Country: Wales
- Sovereign state: United Kingdom
- Post town: TYWYN
- Postcode district: LL36
- Dialling code: 01654
- Police: North Wales
- Fire: North Wales
- Ambulance: Welsh
- UK Parliament: Dwyfor Meirionnydd
- Senedd Cymru – Welsh Parliament: Gwynedd Maldwyn
- List of places UK Wales Gwynedd 52°35′13″N 4°5′14″W Map of the community

Tywyn (/ˈtaʊ.ɪn/; Welsh pronunciation: [ˈtəu̯ɨn]), formerly spelled Towyn, is a town, community, and seaside resort on the Cardigan Bay coast of southern Gwynedd, Wales. It was previously in the historic county of Merionethshire. It is famous as the location of the Cadfan Stone, a stone cross with the earliest known example of written Welsh, and the home of the Talyllyn Railway. It has a population of 3,133 in the 2021 UK Census.

== History of the name ==
The name derives from the Welsh tywyn ('beach, seashore, sand-dune'). The place-name element tywyn is found in many other parts of Wales, most notably Towyn near Abergele and Porth Tywyn (Burry Port).

In Middle Welsh, the spelling was generally Tywyn. In the Early Modern period, however, the spelling Towyn was common in Welsh in order to reflect a slight variation in pronunciation. That also came to be the usual spelling in English up to the latter part of the twentieth century.

With the standardisation of the orthography of the Welsh language in the first part of the 20th century, the spelling Tywyn became increasingly common in all contexts. In 1967, members of Towyn Urban Council voted to request that the town be officially called Tywyn and in July 1967 this was accepted by Merionethshire County Council. Opponents of the change, however, campaigned against it and held an unofficial plebiscite in Tywyn on 25 May 1968. This was organised and financed by tradespeople and the campaign to revert to the spelling Towyn. Those who took part in the vote were asked to decide between Tywyn or Towyn – a large majority of those who voted favoured Towyn. As a result, Tywyn Urban Council (as it had become) requested that the decision to use Tywyn be revisited. In June 1969, this request was declined by Merionethshire County Council and thus the name has remained as Tywyn.

The spelling Tywyn better reflects the name's history and the standard orthography of modern Welsh. Writing in 1967, Melville Richards, the noted toponymist and professor of Welsh at the University College of North Wales, Bangor stated that 'in modern Welsh the form should be uniformly "yw" and therefore, Tywyn is the most acceptable spelling for this name which means a strand or seashore'. In 1974, he further commented: 'Mae'r holl ymrafael ynglŷn â sillebu'r enw wedi codi am fod cryn ansicrwydd ac amrywio yn Gymraeg gynt rhwng y seiniau ow ac yw. Ond yn ddiddadl, Tywyn yw'r ffurf gywir' ('All of the disagreement about spelling the name arises from the historic uncertainty and variation in Welsh between the sounds ow and yw. But, without doubt, Tywyn is the correct form').

In Welsh, the town is sometimes referred to as Tywyn Meirionnydd. In origin, this usage probably refers to the cantref of Meirionnydd, but is now generally understood as referring to the historical county of the same name. In English, during the late nineteenth century and until the middle of the twentieth century, the town was sometimes called Towyn-on-Sea.

== History ==
Tywyn was the location of the first religious community administered by the Breton saint Cadfan upon his arrival in Gwynedd in the early 6th century, prior to his departure he founded a monastery on Bardsey Island off the Llŷn Peninsula. The church contains some early material (see below).

== Location ==
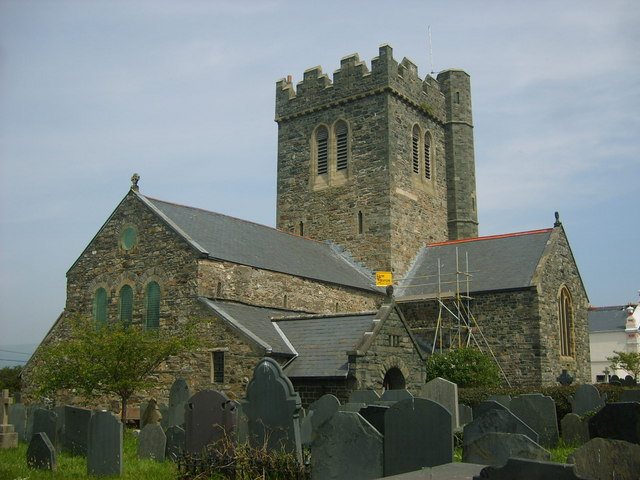
St Cadfan's Church, Tywyn

The town's historic centre lies about a kilometre from the beach, around St Cadfan's Church. In the second half of the nineteenth century the town expanded considerably, mainly towards the sea.

To the north of the town lie the reclaimed salt marshes of Morfa Tywyn and Morfa Gwyllt, beyond which lie the Broad Water lagoon and the mouth of the Afon Dysynni. To the north-east lie the rich farmland of Bro Dysynni and the village of Bryncrug, and to the east the hills of Craig y Barcud and Craig Fach Goch. To the south towards Aberdyfi is the mouth of the Afon Dyffryn Gwyn and Morfa Penllyn.

The Tywyn coastal defence scheme, officially unveiled on 24 March 2011 by Jane Davidson (then Welsh Assembly Government Minister for Environment, Sustainability and Housing), provides a rock breakwater above the low-tide level, rock groynes, and rock revetment to protect 80 sea-front properties. The costs of this civil engineering project was £7.62M, shared between the Welsh Assembly Government (£4.135M) and the European Union's Regional Development Fund (£3.485M).

== Language and demography ==
Until the middle of the twentieth century, Welsh was the main language of Tywyn. The local dialect is of a northern type with some features that are shared with southern dialects. This combinations of features led one Victorian observer to state that three languages were spoken in the town: English, Welsh and 'Tywynaeg'.

Victorian Tywyn was overwhelmingly Welsh-speaking with English being for most a language learnt in school rather than in the home or on the street. Indeed, in the town's British School in the 1860s, a 'Welsh stick' (a version of the Welsh Not) was used to punish children who were caught speaking Welsh in school. According to the 1901 and 1911 censuses, the percentages of Welsh speakers in the Towyn Urban District (as it then was) were 86.5% and 83.5% respectively, with 22.4% and 13.8% recorded as speaking only Welsh.

Welsh remained the dominant language in Tywyn until the middle of the twentieth century. In his book Railway Adventure, L. T. C. Rolt recounts walking up the track of the Talyllyn Railway during the Second World War – on stopping to speak to two elderly railway workers a couple of miles from the town, he found that they didn't understand English. Increased tourism, however, and the impact of the military camps on the outskirts of the town had a significant impact on language use and English came to predominate.

At the time of the 2001 census, 40.5% of the population were recorded as Welsh speakers. By the 2011 census this had decreased to 37.5%. In 2016, an Estyn inspection of Ysgol Penybryn, the town's primary school (whose catchment area includes Aberdyfi), noted that about 22% of the children at the school came from Welsh-speaking homes. In 2025, the equivlaent figure was 19.5%.

Tywyn is now a significantly anglicised town, with the majority of its population (52.8%) having been born in England according to the 2011 census. Likewise, slightly more respondents claimed an English-only identity (35.0%) than a Welsh-only identity (33.7%).

== Transport and tourism ==
Improved transport links during the 19th century increased Tywyn's appeal as a tourist destination. In the early decades of that century, a creek of the river Dysynni allowed ships to approach the town's northern fringes, where there was a shipbuilding yard. The draining of the salt marsh and the channelling of the river brought this industry to an end, but during the early part of that century the town was made more accessible by building new roads along the coast to Aberdyfi and Llwyngwril.

The railway arrived in the mid-1860s (first as the Aberystwith and Welsh Coast Railway, then as Cambrian Railways), and had a significant effect on the town. Tywyn railway station opened in 1863. The station is still open, and is served by the Cambrian Line.

Bus services are run by Lloyds Coaches. Services run to surrounding towns and villages.

Slate-quarrying at Bryn Eglwys quarry near Abergynolwyn led to the building in 1865 of the Talyllyn Railway, a narrow-gauge line designed to carry slates to Tywyn. Two stations were opened in the town. Tywyn Wharf railway station was originally opened to enable slates to be unloaded onto a wharf adjacent to the main railway line. It is now the Talyllyn's western terminus and principal station. Pendre railway station was originally the passenger station and now houses the locomotive and carriage sheds and works.

Notable visitors who stayed at Tywyn in the 19th century include:

- Thomas Love Peacock (1811, at Botalog)
- Thomas Fremantle, 1st Baron Cottesloe (1818)
- Ignatius Spencer (1818)
- Charles Darwin (1819, at Plas Edwards, now demolished)
- Sir Rupert Kettle (who built Glan-y-don, now demolished, as a holiday home in 1866)
- William Morris (1875)
- Elizabeth Blackwell (exact date uncertain, at Brynarfor, now demolished)
- Margaret Brooke, Ranee of Sarawak (1883)

The beach and its extensive promenade have long been key attractions. In 1877, a pier was authorised by the Towyn Pier Order 1877 and built towards the northern end of the beach, but the structure only lasted a few months. The street called 'Pier Road', which leads from the town to the beach, offers a suggestion as to its location. The promenade was completed in 1889 at the cost of some £30,000, paid for by John Corbett (1817–1901) of Ynysymaengwyn.

There has been extensive bungalow and caravan development in the vicinity.

== Other industries ==
Apart from tourism, agriculture has long been the most important industry in the area. Lead and copper used to be mined in the town's hinterland.

The Marconi Company built a Long Wave receiver station in Tywyn in 1914, working in duplex with the high-power transmitter station near Waunfawr. In 1921 the Tywyn and Waunfawr stations initiated a transatlantic wireless telegraph service with a similar RCA wireless transmitting station in New Brunswick, New Jersey, USA and RCA's receiver station in Belmar, New Jersey. This new transatlantic service replaced Marconi's obsolete transatlantic telegraph station in Clifden, Ireland following its 1922 destruction during the Irish Civil War.

For most of the 20th century, the armed forces were a significant presence in Tywyn. The town was a major training ground for the amphibious warfare landings in the Second World War and had a strategic war base. Abandoned pillboxes may still be seen on the coast to the south of the town. RAF Towyn opened on 8 September 1940 as an air-cooperation base for the Royal Artillery Anti-Aircraft Practice Camp at Tonfanau, but closed on 25 July 1945. The links with the armed forces came to an end when the Joint Service Mountain Training Centre at Morfa Camp closed in 1999. Morfa camp is now in private ownership and many buildings are let as small storage units.

== Facilities and notable features ==
Much of the town's infrastructure was put in place by an industrialist from the English Midlands, John Corbett, who in the 1870s decided to develop the town into a major tourist resort to rival Torquay. As well as constructing a row of boarding houses and a grand esplanade, he developed the water and sewerage system. He gave land and money for a new Market Hall, built to celebrate Queen Victoria's Diamond Jubilee in 1897. He paid for Brynarfor (formerly a private school called the Towyn Academy and then Brynarvor Hall School) to be opened as 'Towyn Intermediate School' in 1894. He refurbished the Corbet Arms Hotel (from then on spelled with two 't's), and also contributed to the Assembly Room (1893), now the Magic Lantern Cinema. Plaques commemorating his generosity may still be seen on the north end of the promenade and on the Market Hall. Another commemorative plaque was on Brynarfor (now demolished), and his portrait was hung there when the school first opened. However, the anticipated grand watering-place never took off, and these additions to the town were never matched.

In 1912, a drill hall was built in the Pendre area of the town for the Territorial Army (the 7th Battalion the Royal Welsh Fusiliers). The hall, now known as Neuadd Pendre, has recently been renovated, mainly with money from the National Lottery Big Lottery Fund and the Welsh Government. The hall houses a 3-manual 9-rank Wurlitzer Organ which was originally installed in a cinema in Woolwich in 1937.

Tywyn Hospital (formerly Towyn and District War Memorial Cottage Hospital) is located on the outskirts of the town, on land known as Pen-y-bryn Mawr that was gifted by Thomas Corbett of Ynysymaengwyn. The foundation stone was laid by Dame Margaret Lloyd George on 11 August 1920 and the hospital was officially opened on 17 August 1922 by Sir Osmond Williams.

Like the hospital, Towyn Memorial Institute was built to commemorate those killed in the First World War. It was officially opened by David Lloyd George on 29 October 1926. The Institute was the location of the town's library before a new library building was built next to it and officially opened on 18 January 1973. The Institute was closed in 2007.

The main schools in Tywyn are the primary school, Ysgol Penybryn, and the secondary school, Ysgol Uwchradd Tywyn.

Local places of interest include Craig yr Aderyn (Bird Rock), Castell y Bere, Llanfendigaid Estate and Llyn Myngul (Tal-y-llyn Lake). Hen Dyffryn Gwyn is a Grade II listed building dating from 1640 which retains many of its original features.

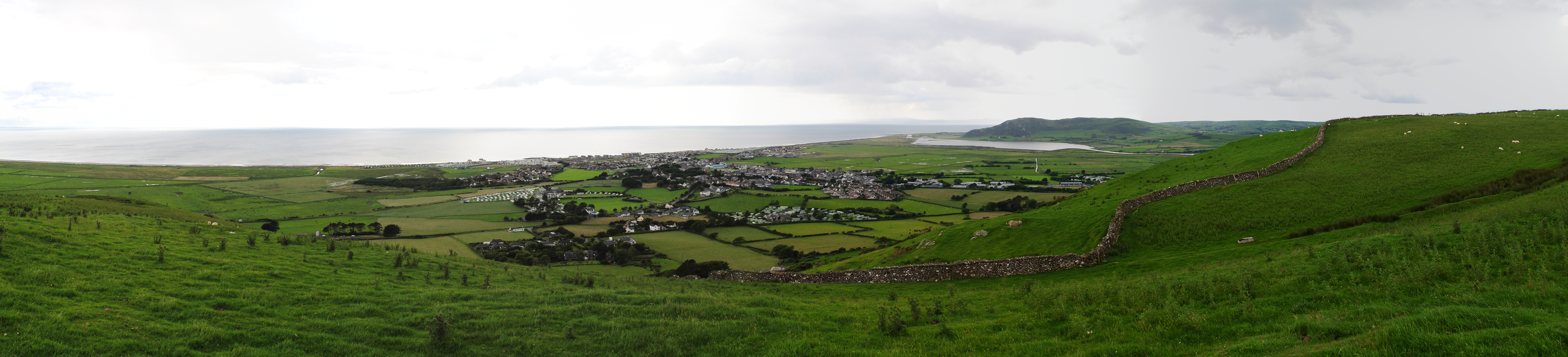
Panorama of Tywyn from a hill to the East of the town, taken in July 2012

== Religion ==
For many centuries, St Cadfan's church was the only place of worship in the town, but since the 19th century there have been several.

Following the Methodist Revival, the Calvinistic Methodists established thesmelves at Tywyn at the end of the 18th century. Bethel Calvinistic Methodist Church (Welsh-speaking Presbyterian Church of Wales) was established in 1815. The current chapel was built in 1871 and altered in 1887. The chapel closed in early 2010 but services are still held in the vestry.

Bethany Calvinistic Methodist Chapel (English-speaking Presbyterian Church of Wales) was also built in 1871 as one of the 'Inglis Côs' ('English cause') chapels that were advocated by Lewis Edwards and fiercely criticised by Emrys ap Iwan. It was opened in part with a view to attracting the increasing numbers of visitors who were coming to Tywyn since the opening of the railway and who previously had been provided for only by the English services at St Cadfan's. The noted pacifist George Maitland Lloyd Davies was minister of Bethany and also of Maethlon Chapel in nearby Cwm Maethlon (Happy Valley) between 1926 and 1930. Bethany closed in 2016.

Ebeneser (Welsh-speaking Wesleyan Methodist Church in Wales) was first built between 1817 and 1820 on a site off whats is now Brook Street. In 1883 the congregation moved to a new chapel on the High Street. John Cadvan Davies (1846–1923), Archdruid of Wales in 1923, was minister of Ebeneser between 1889 and 1892.

The original Bethesda Independent Chapel (Welsh-speaking Congregationalist) opened in 1820 on what is now Brook Street and was enlarged in 1865. The congregation moved to the newly built Bethesda Newydd ('new Bethesda') on the High Street in 1892. It closed as a place of worship in January 2010 and is now a private residence. The original Bethesda is now a Masonic Hall.

Tywyn Baptist Church (English-speaking) was opened in 1900 and re-built in its present form in 1991.

In 1935, Mary Corbett, daughter of John Corbett of Ynysymaengwyn, leased the old Ebeneser Wesleyan chapel off Brook Street for use as a Roman Catholic chapel. In 1969, the new Church of St David, designed by architects Weightman & Bullen, opened on Corbett Avenue. In its grounds is a sculpture of St David in Welsh slate by John Skelton. The church is part of Dolgellau Deanery.

== Sport ==
In Samuel Lewis's A Topographical Dictionary of Wales (1833) it is reported that popular horse races were held on land to the north of the town every September. Between 1904 and 1947, Towyn Golf Club (originally the Towyn-on-Sea Golf Club) was also located on land to the north of the town.

The Towyn-on-Sea club opened with a 10-hole course in 1904, in 1906 a further eight holes were added. Attempts were made to re-establish the club following the Second World War but these proved unsuccessful.

In the past Tywyn has had a rugby union team, and it now shares a football team with neighbouring Bryncrug (Tywyn & Bryncrug F.C.), playing their home matches in the village of Bryncrug. It also has a cricket club, Tywyn and District CC and a hockey team known as Dysynni Hockey Club. Also based in Tywyn is the Bro Dysynni Athletics Club.

== Notable people ==
See Category:People from Tywyn

- Arthur ap Huw (fl. 1555–1570), vicar of St Cadfan's 1555/1570, notable patron of Welsh poets, and translator of counter-Reformation literature into Welsh.
- Martin J. Ball (born 1951) professor in Linguistics at Bangor University.
- Tom Bradshaw (born 1992), footballer with over 360 club caps and 3 for Wales
- Robert L. Chidlaw-Roberts (1896–1989), World War I flying ace
- Robin Davies (1954–2010), Welsh TV and film actor; starred in Catweazle playing the part of Carrot.
- Evan Evans (1731– 1788), bardic name Ieuan Fardd, poet and scholar, curate of St Cadfan's 1772/1777.
- Edward Ernest Hughes (1877–1953), the first professor of history at University College, Swansea, was born in Tywyn, the son of a local policeman.
- Griffith Hughes (1707–c.1758) clergyman from the parish of Tywyn, author of The Natural History of Barbados.
- John Ceiriog Hughes (1832–1887), poet, stationmaster at Tywyn for a short period from 1870.
- Joseph David Jones (1827–1870), musician, schoolmaster at Tywyn British School from 1851 to 1855.
- Sir Henry Haydn Jones (1863–1950), MP for Merioneth, brought up and lived in Tywyn.
- John Daniel Jones (1865–1942), Congregationalist minister, brought up in Tywyn.
- Owen Wynne Jones (1828–1870), bardic name Glasynys, Welsh cleric, antiquary, author and poet.
- Dai Lloyd (born 1956), Plaid Cymru politician and Member of the Senedd, was born in Tywyn.
- David Richards (1751–1827), bardic name Dafydd Ionawr, poet, from Glanymorfa is the author of an englyn to his mother Ann Dafydd (d. 1785) which is preserved on a brass plate in St Cadfan's Church.
- R. Bryn Williams (1902–1981), bardic name Bryn, Welsh-language writer, poet, playwright and historian; lived in Patagonia as a child.

== See also ==
- Towyn power station
- RAF Towyn
