= Rhodri Jones =

Wales international rugby union footballer

- Born: Rhodri Jones; 23 December 1991 (age 34) Aberystwyth, Wales
- Height: 1.91 m (6 ft 3 in)
- Weight: 116 kg (18.3 st)
- School: Ysgol Uwchradd Tywyn, Llandovery College

Rugby union career
- Position: Loosehead prop
- Current team: Ospreys
Senior career
Years	Team	Apps	(Points)
2009–2010	Llandovery	13	(15)
2010–2014	Llanelli	25	(0)
2013	→ Carmarthen	1	(0)
2010–2016	Scarlets	101	(10)
2016–2022	Ospreys	57	(5)
2022–	Dragons	(25)	(0)
- Correct as of 11:47, 6 February 2024 (UTC)
International career
Years	Team	Apps	(Points)
2010–2011	Wales U20	12	(5)
2011–2023	Wales	24	(0)
- Correct as of 26 November 2022

Rhodri Jones (born 23 December 1991) is a Wales international rugby union player. Jones was born in Aberystwyth, and is a Welsh-speaker. He currently plays for the Dragons RFC, having previously played for Ospreys, Scarlets and Llanelli. His position is loosehead prop.

He has had 15 appearances for Llaneli and 100 for the Welsh region side the Scarlets.

Jones has also represented the Wales U20 national side.

In November 2011 Jones was named in the senior Wales training squad for the match versus Australia on 3 December 2011. He made his debut for Wales against the Barbarians on 2 June 2012 at the Millennium Stadium.

At the end of the 2015–16 it was announced that Jones had signed for the Ospreys and he would link up with then at the end of the Wales tour to New Zealand.

Jones joined Dragons RFC in 2022.
