= Eddie Hughes =

Eddie Hughes may refer to:

- Eddie Hughes (Australian politician), Labor Member of the South Australian House of Assembly
- Eddie Hughes (basketball) (born 1960), American basketball player
- Eddie Hughes (British politician) (born 1968), Conservative MP for Walsall North

== See also ==
- Edward Hughes (disambiguation)
- Ed Hughes (disambiguation)
- Hughes (surname)
