= Edward Anwyl (Wesleyan minister) =

Welsh Wesleyan minister (1786–1857)

Edward Anwyl (1786–1857) was a Welsh Wesleyan minister and school teacher.

== Early life ==
Born in April 1786 at Ty'nllan, Llanegryn, Merionethshire, his parents were Ann and Owen Anwyl. He attended the school in his hometown until he was about 12 years of age, when he became a farm laborer because his father was dying. From that point, he continued his studies on his own.

== Career ==
Griffith Hughes of the Wesleyans came to town in 1804 and he joined the church two years later. Anwyl was ordained in 1808, having preached his first sermon earlier in the year. From then until his retirement in 1854 he served in twenty-one successive circuits. For sixteen years, he was the North Wales district chairman. Described as an "indefatigable" worker, he is reported to have walked 72 miles one Sunday to deliver sermons at three locations.

At some point he had moved to Penrhyndeudraeth and also taught school. He died on 23 January 1857 at Holywell.
