= RAF Towyn =

Former Royal Air Force station in Gwynedd, Wales

RAF Towyn
- Tywyn, Gwynedd in Wales
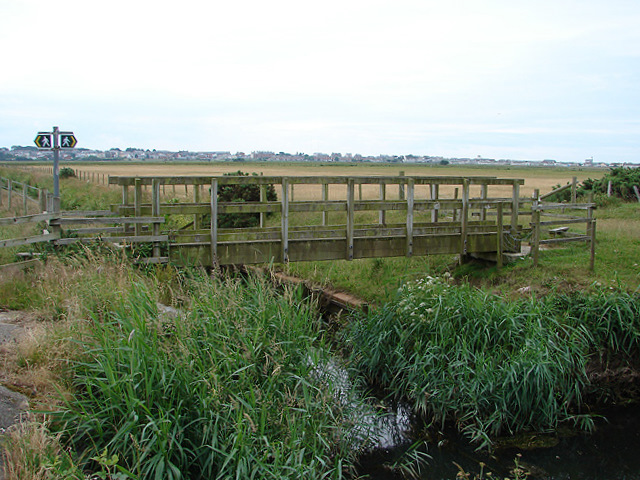
- Looking south westwards over what was the grassed runway area for aircraft at RAF Towyn

Site information
- Type: Royal Air Force Anti-Aircraft Co-operation Unit
- Owner: Air Ministry
- Operator: Royal Air Force
- Controlled by: RAF Army Cooperation Command 1940-43 * No. 70 Group RAF 1940-45; RAF Technical Training Command 1945 * No. 22 Group RAF 1945

Location
- Shown within Gwynedd RAF Towyn (the United Kingdom)
- Coordinates: 52°35′38″N 004°05′53″W

Site history
- Built: 1939
- In use: 1940-1945
- Battles/wars: European theatre of World War II

Garrison information
- Occupants: 1944; Officers - 15 (2 WAAF); Other Ranks - 522 (100 WAAF)

Airfield information
- Elevation: 4 metres (13 ft) AMSL
Runways
Direction	Length and surface
NE/SE	3,900 feet (1,200 m) Grass field
NE/SW	3,600 feet (1,100 m) Grass field
E/W	2,100 feet (640 m) Grass field

Royal Air Force Towyn, or more simply RAF Towyn, is a former Royal Air Force airfield located 10.3 miles (16.6 km) west of Machynlleth, Powys and 12.2 miles (19.6 km) north of Aberystwyth, Ceredigion, Wales.

Situated along the northern outskirts of Tywyn and within the southern area of Aber Dysynni, it opened for RAF Army Cooperation Command in 1940 as an air-cooperation base for the Royal Artillery Anti-Aircraft Practice Camp at Tonfanau. It was home to two flights which formed into a single squadron, but in May 1945 the squadron moved to RAF Llandbedr and RAF Towyn was transferred to No. 22 Group RAF in RAF Technical Training Command. Airfield personnel also supported the emergency services when air accidents occurred in north west Wales. The air base closed in July 1945 and the site was taken over by the army as Morfa Camp.

== History ==
=== Station design ===
Towyn airfield had three grass landing strips, 1,189 m (3,900 ft), 1,097 m (3,600 ft) and 640 m (2,100 ft) long. The control tower was constructed to specification 952/40. The main site was made up of various Maycrete huts (prefabricated structures of reinforced concrete posts supporting a pitched roof frame with an infilling of sawdust concrete panels) and Nissen huts, with two Bessonneau canvas hangars. Two Bellman hangars and two Blister hangars were later added along with a concrete apron.

=== RAF Army Cooperation Command ===
The camp was opened on 8 September 1940 as an Anti-Aircraft Co-operation unit for nearby Tonfanau under No. 70 Group RAF, Army Co-operation Command (AACU). The main function of the Flights on the base was to tow targets for the AACU at Tonfanau.

RAF Towyn was designated an emergency and diversionary airfield for Cardigan Bay. Notable incidents included:

- On 3 June 1940 a Hawker Henley crashed 0.5 miles (0.8 km) from the airfield.
- A Bristol Beaufort of No. 217 Sqn made an emergency landing at Towyn due to engine problems on 11 November 1940.
- Twelve Lockheed P-38 Lightning aircraft of the 97th Fighter Squadron made emergency landings on 16 December 1943. One of these aircraft crashed into a gun post, leaving the airfield not operational for two days.
- The most notable incident was on 8 July 1944. A Boeing B-17 Flying Fortress of the 569th Bomber Squadron, USAAF, made an emergency landing at RAF Towyn. Intending to land at RAF Llanbedr, it could only get as far as Towyn. With the runways too short for the aircraft, it carried on over the adjacent railway tracks and crashed into an air raid shelter. All fifteen aircrew survived.

In December 1943, No 1605 and 1628 Flights were disbanded and joined together to form No. 631 Squadron RAF. This Squadron stayed at Towyn until May 1945 when it moved on to RAF Llanbedr and the base was closed to flying soon afterwards.

The base continued to be a military working environment; it was used occasionally over the years.

== Royal Air Force Operational History ==
=== Anti-Aircraft Co-operation ===
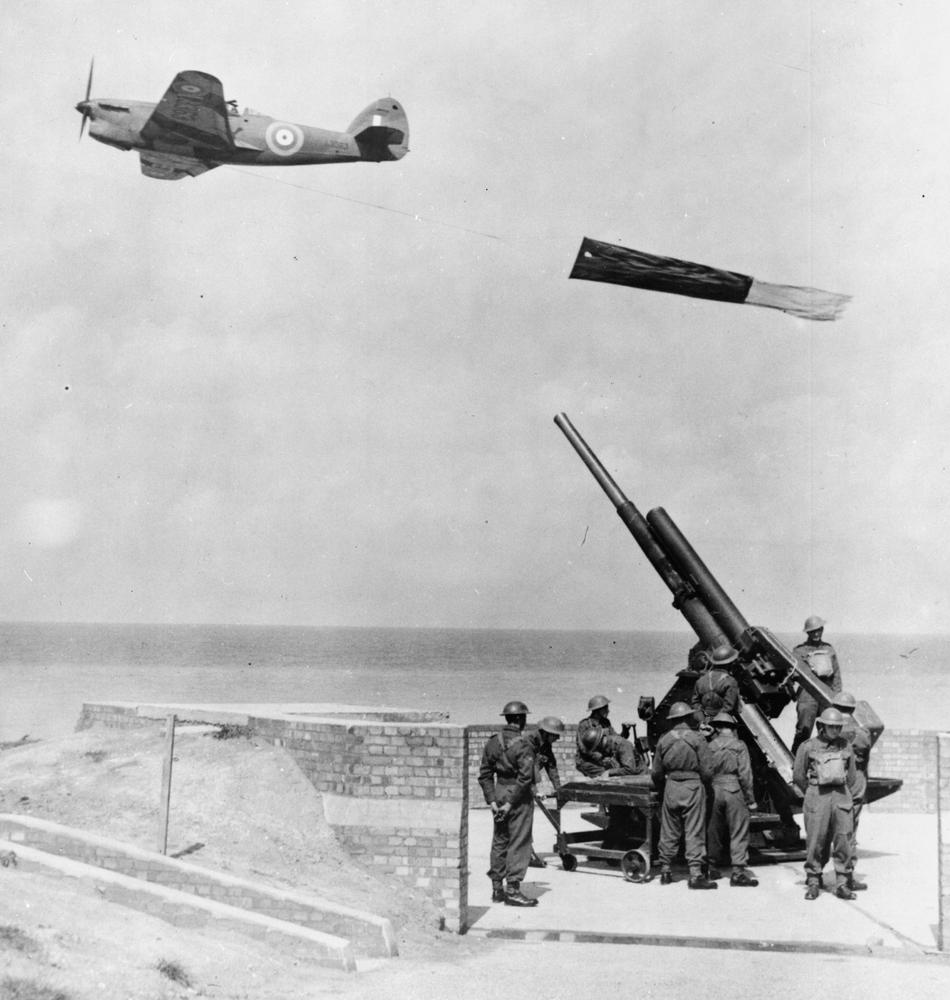
A Royal Air Force Hawker Henley Mk.I towing a flag target over an anti-aircraft gun position somewhere on the British coast

==== 'U' Flight 1 AACU ====
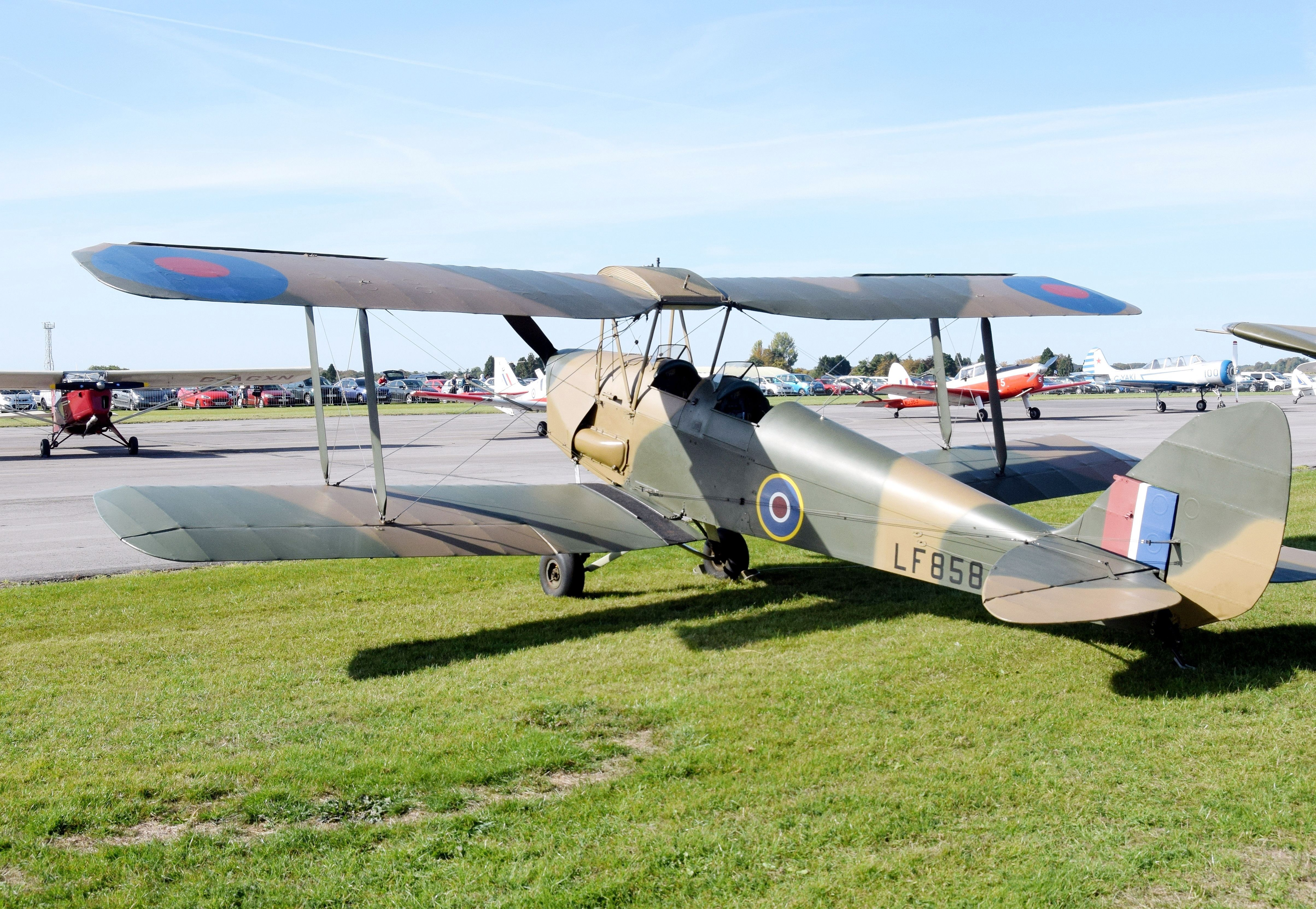
deHavillandDH-82B Queen Bee, an example of the type used at RAF Towyn

‘U' Flight of No. 1 Anti-Aircraft Co-operation Unit RAF (1 AACU) was equipped with the de Havilland DH.82 Queen Bee a pilotless radio-controlled target drone variant of the Tiger Moth aircraft, used from RAF Towyn for training artillery gunners, at the Royal Artillery Camp at Tonfanau, with their Anti-aircraft target practice. It arrived on the 15 September 1940, from RAF St Athan. ‘U' Flight of 1 AACU disbanded on the 30 October 1942 at RAF Towyn.

==== 'C' Flight 1 AACU ====
‘C' Flight of No. 1 Anti-Aircraft Co-operation Unit RAF (1 AACU) arrived at RAF Towyn on the 28 June 1941, from RAF Penrhos. It was equipped with Hawker Henley aircraft used in the target tug role, for target towing in support of anti-aircraft target practice, at Tonfanau. It disbanded at Towyn on the 1 November 1942, re numbering to become No. 1605 (Anti-Aircraft Co-operation) Flight RAF, and receiving Miles Martinet target tug aircraft.

No. 4 RAF Regiment Anti-Aircraft Practice Camp Target Towing Flight was based at RAF Towyn from the 1 April 1943. Around six weeks later it disbanded and became No. 1628 (Anti-Aircraft Co-operation) Flight RAF, on the 17 June 1943. The flight was equipped with Hawker Henley III and Westland Lysander III aircraft.

==== 631 Squadron ====
No. 631 Squadron RAF was an anti-aircraft co-operation squadron. It was formed at RAF Towyn on 1 December 1943, by disbanding and merging 1605 (AAC) Flight and 1628 (AAC) Flight, for anti-aircraft co-operation duties. As well as operating the Hawker Henley III aircraft from the disbanded Flights in the target tug role, the squadron was also equipped with Hawker Hurricane IIc from March 1944, which were used for gun laying training. From September 1944 Miles Martinet I aircraft were also used, and the Hawker Henley were withdrawn in February 1945. The squadron left on 10 May 1945, moving to RAF Llanbedr.

A detachment from No. 6 Anti-aircraft Co-operation Unit arrived at RAF Towyn on 7 March 1943. It remained for around six months, departing on 13 September. However, on the same day a detachment from No. 8 Anti-aircraft Co-operation Unit took over, and remained for just over one year, before leaving RAF Towyn on 12 October 1944.

=== Other units ===
==== RAF Regiment ====
2772 Squadron RAF Regiment came into existence on the 1 February 1942 at RAF Towyn. Unnumbered from April 1941, it then formed at RAF Towyn, in July 1941, as 772 Squadron. From the beginning of February 1942 ground defence squadrons had 2000 added to their numbers and were absorbed into the RAF Regiment.

==== University Air Squadron ====
Aberystwyth University Air Squadron operated out of RAF Towyn from 1943 to 1944.

== Current use ==
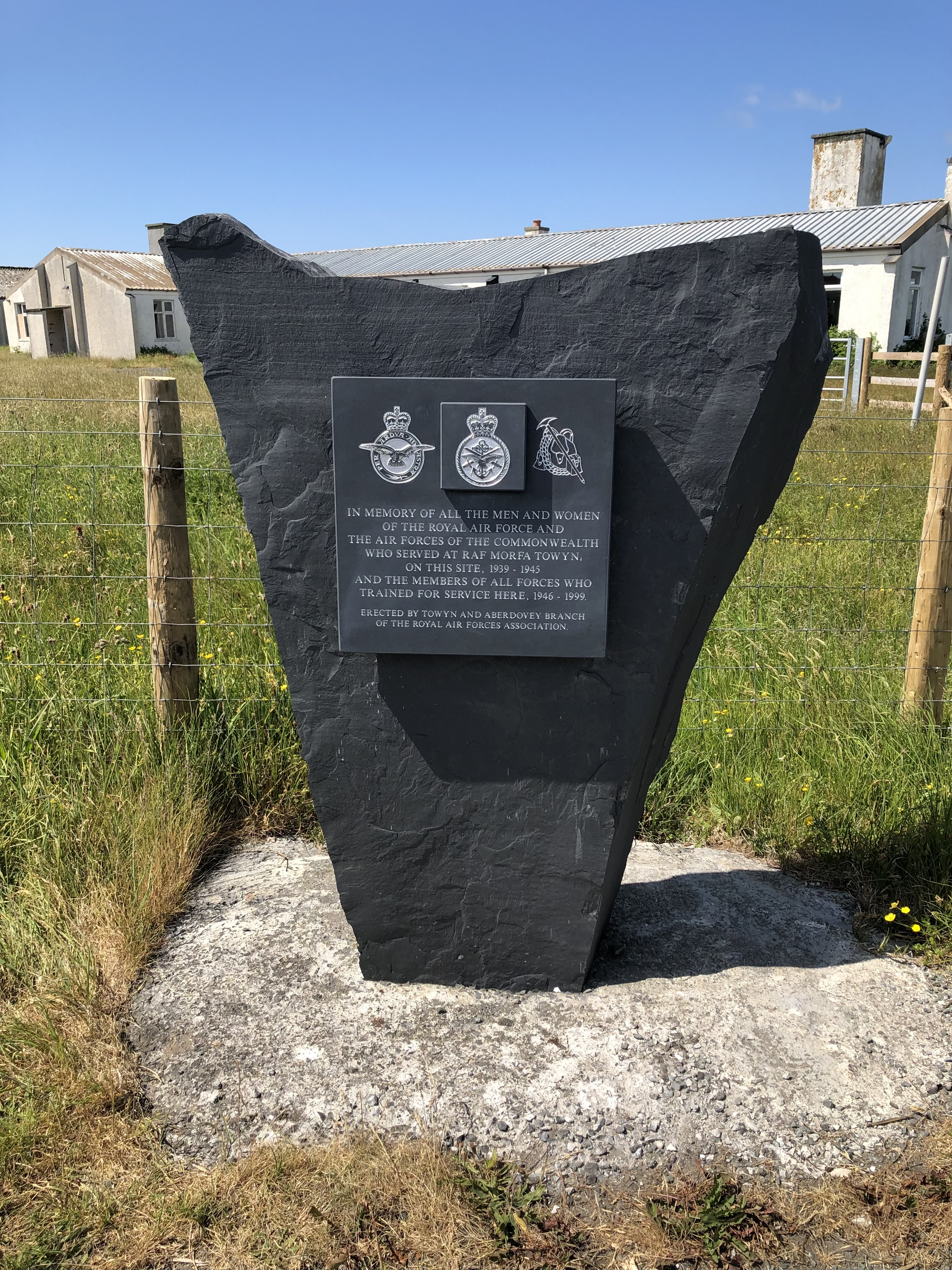
Plaque reads “In memory of all the men and women of the Royal Air Force and the airforces of the commonwealth who served at RAF Morfa Towyn, on this site, 1939-1945 and the members of all forces who trained for service here, 1946-1999. Erected by Towyn and Aberdovey Branch of the Royal Air Forces Association”

There is a commemorative plaque mounted on a slate monument at the entrance to the former camp. A Solar Farm now occupies part of the site. Nearly all of the wartime buildings have disappeared and the concrete aprons have reduced. The hangars have all gone but some support buildings remain, although they are largely vacant.

== Previous units ==
The following units were stationed RAF Towyn at some point:

- No. 1 Anti-Aircraft Co-operation Unit RAF (1 AACU) 'C' Flight.
- No. 1 Anti-Aircraft Co-operation Unit RAF (1 AACU) 'U' Flight.
- No. 6 Anti-Aircraft Co-operation Unit RAF.
- No. 8 Anti-Aircraft Co-operation Unit RAF.
- No. 1605 (Anti-Aircraft Co-operation) Flight RAF.
- No. 1628 (Anti-Aircraft Co-operation) Flight RAF.
- No 2706 Squadron RAF Regiment.
- No 2772 Squadron RAF Regiment.
- No 2800 Squadron RAF Regiment.
- No. 631 Squadron RAF
- Aberystwyth UAS

== See also ==
- List of former Royal Air Force stations
- Tywyn
