= Ed Hughes (disambiguation) =

Ed Hughes (1927–2000) was an American football player and coach.

Ed Hughes may also refer to:

- Ed Hughes (actor), English actor in This House (play)
- Ed Hughes (anchor) (1938–2004), former news anchor in Norfolk, Virginia
- Ed Hughes (baseball) (1880–1927), baseball player
- Ed Hughes (composer) (born 1968), British composer

== See also ==
- Edward Hughes (disambiguation)
- Eddie Hughes (disambiguation)
