= Hen Dyffryn Gwyn =

Historic building in Gwynedd, Wales

Coordinates: 52.5655°N 4.0191°W

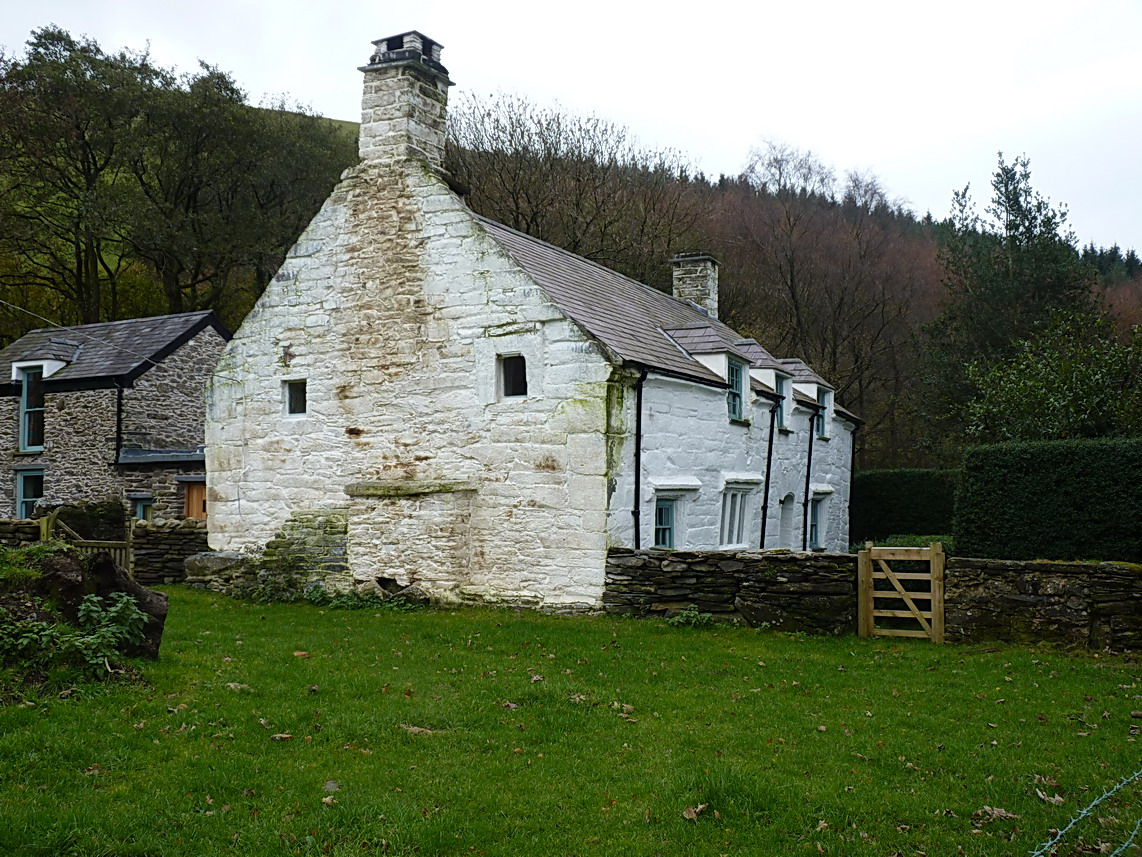

Hen Dyffryn Gwyn is a Grade II* listed building in Tywyn, Gwynedd. The house has been dated to 1640 and is listed for being a well-preserved example of a rural dwelling house with strong external character and original detail.

== History ==
Hen Dyffryn Gwyn is a typical old Welsh farmhouse. It is the original Dyffryn Gwyn and only described as Hen Dyffryn Gwyn since the 1960s or probably 1970 when a chalet bungalow was built for the present day farmer. Dyffryn Gwyn farm was tenanted until 1960, regarded as the largest farm in Cwm Maethlon until then, when much of the mountain and some field were sold. In a list of Crown Lands in 1633 it is listed as the Place (Plas) in Dyffryn Gwyn. It is listed as a place of patronage for bards in the late Middle Ages - 'Beirdd yr Uchelwyr'. This house dates back to 1640 as is marked on the front of the house. It is thought to have originally been built with a three-room plan. In the late eighteenth century a staircase was added in the centre; there is an inscribed stone on the outside wall dated 1772 which may commemorate this. In the nineteenth century a detached service building for washing and bread making according to early 20th century farmer was added and in the 1930s, this was linked to the house. It is a two-storey building at the back of the main farmhouse, which was called 'Ty Newydd' by the family that lived there from 1902 - 1960. Occasionally travellers would sleep upstairs but it was used as a storage shed as well for wool and other small implements. In 1965, minor alterations were made to the interior of the house, but apart from this, little has changed over the years.

== The house ==
The house is built of dressed stone blocks on boulder footings with large quoins. The roof would have originally been thatched but is now slated. There are chimney stacks at both ends, the one on the left being flush with the end wall and original. The main door is right of centre and is surmounted by a small arch. There are three windows on the ground floor and three half-dormer windows in the roof. There is a stone inscribed "HP 1640" above the left, mullioned window.

The entrance hall has a straight staircase and wooden partitioning on either side separating it from the parlour on the right and the kitchen on the left. In the parlour, the fireplace has been blocked up but there is a window seat below the window in the rear wall. In the kitchen, the fireplace has a wooden lintel, a niche to the right and the remains of the original stone staircase also to the right. The upper storey has wooden partitioning, some of which may be eighteenth century. and the roof is supported by two collar-beam trusses.
