= John Daniel Jones =

Welsh minister

John Daniel Jones CH
- Born: 13 April 1865; Ruthin, Denbighshire, Wales
- Died: 19 April 1942 (aged 77); Wales
- Education: University of Manchester, Lancashire Independent College, University of St Andrews
- Occupation: Congregational minister
- Years active: 1889–1937
- Notable work: Chairman of the Congregational Union of England and Wales (1909–10, 1925–26)
- Title: Reverend
- Parent(s): Joseph David Jones (father), David Morgan Bynner (stepfather)
- Relatives: Henry Haydn Jones (brother)

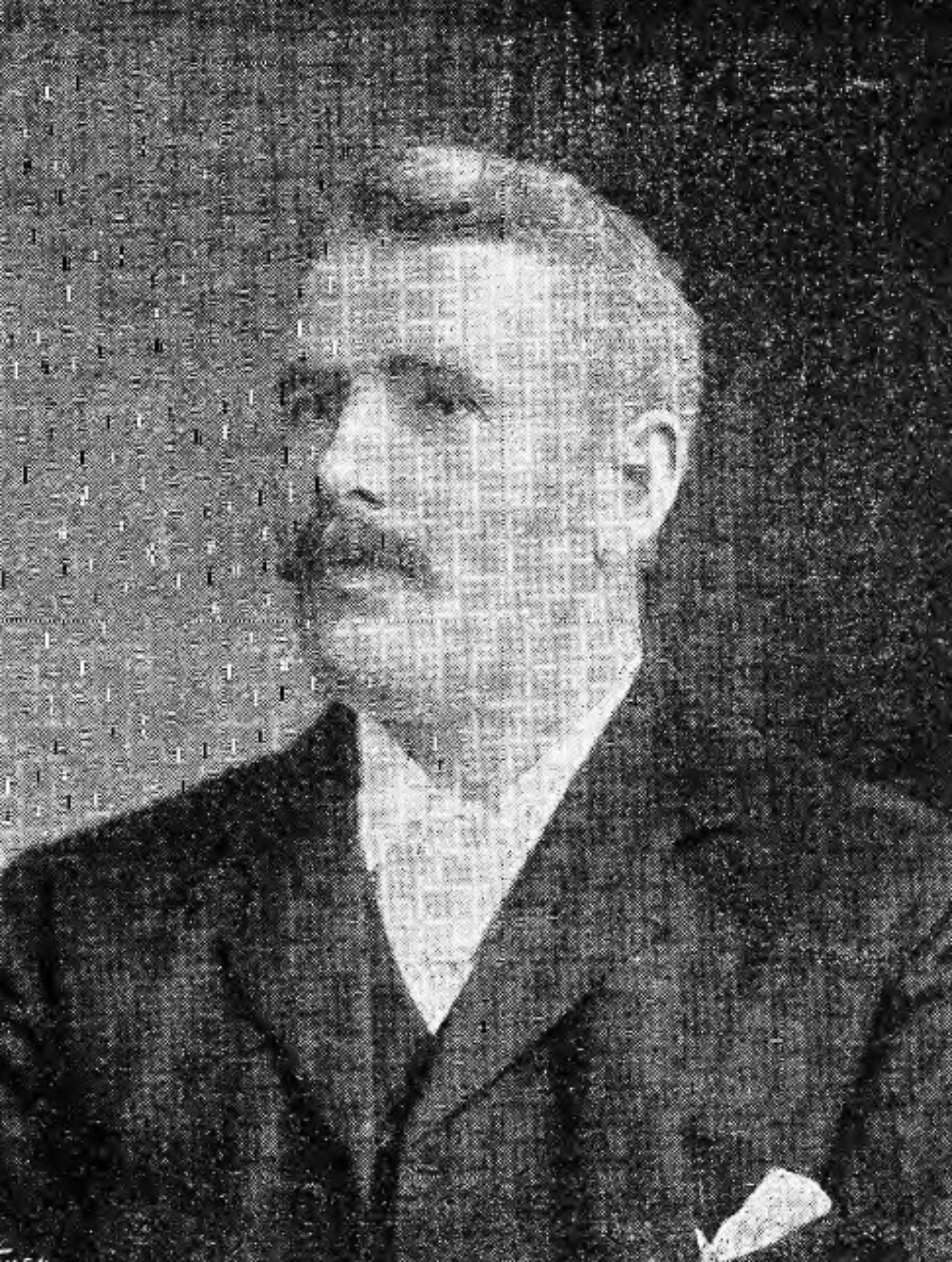
John Daniel Jones

John Daniel Jones CH (13 April 1865 – 19 April 1942) was a Welsh Congregational minister.

He was born in Ruthin, Denbighshire, the son of Joseph David Jones (1827–70), a schoolmaster in the town and a respected musician and composer. The family moved to Tywyn, his mother's home town. In 1877, after the early death of his father, his mother married David Morgan Bynner, a Congregational minister at Chorley. After studying at Manchester University, Lancashire Independent College and St Andrews University, he was ordained at Newland Congregational Church, Lincoln in 1889.

Jones became well known as the minister of Richmond Hill Church, Bournemouth where he was minister from 1898 to 1937. He was elected chairman of the Congregational Union of England and Wales in 1909–10, and again in 1925–6. In 1919 he was elected an honorary secretary of the union, a position which he held until his death.

Politically a Liberal, Jones spoke regularly in support of his brother Henry Haydn Jones, MP for Merioneth from 1910 to 1945. Lloyd George was a personal friend and in retirement a near neighbour and visitor.

After his return to Wales to retire, he was the subject of a memorable satirical poem by Saunders Lewis.

== Works ==
- The Glorious Company of the Apostles (1885)
- The Model Prayer: A Series of Expositions on "The Lord's Prayer" (1899)
- Paul's Certainties and Other Sermons (1900)
- Reasons Why for Congregationalists (1904)
- Elims of Life: and Other Sermons (1904)
- Christ's Pathway to the Cross (1905)
- The Gospel of Grace (1907)
- Things Most Surely Believed (1908)
- Our Life Beyond (1911)
- The Hope of the Gospel (1911)
- The Unfettered Word. A Series of Readings for the Quiet Hour (1912)
- The Gospel According to St. Mark, vol. 1-4 (1913)
- The Gospel of the Sovereignty (1914)
- The Great Hereafter: Questions Raised By the Great War Concerning the Destiny of Our Dead (1915)
- If a Man Die (1917)
- The Lord of Life and Death (1919)
- The King of Love: Meditations on the Twenty-Third Psalm (1922)
- The Greatest of These: Addresses on the Thirteenth Chapter of First Corinthians (1925)
- Watching the Cross (1926)
- The Ideal Church Member (1926) (New edition with new chapters, 1955)
- The Inevitable Christ (1928)
- On Religious Teaching in the Schools (1929, pamphlet)
- Pilate's Three Questions (1931)
- Richmond Hill Sermons (1932)
- Morning and Evening (1934)
- The Way into the Kingdom, or, Thoughts on the Beatitudes (1934)
- Keep Festival: Sermons on the Great Occasions of the Christian Year (1939)
- Three Score Years and Ten: The Autobiography of J. D. Jones (1940)
- The Power to Endure (1940)
- Our Debt to the Reformation (N.D.)
