= Rupert Alfred Kettle =

English judge

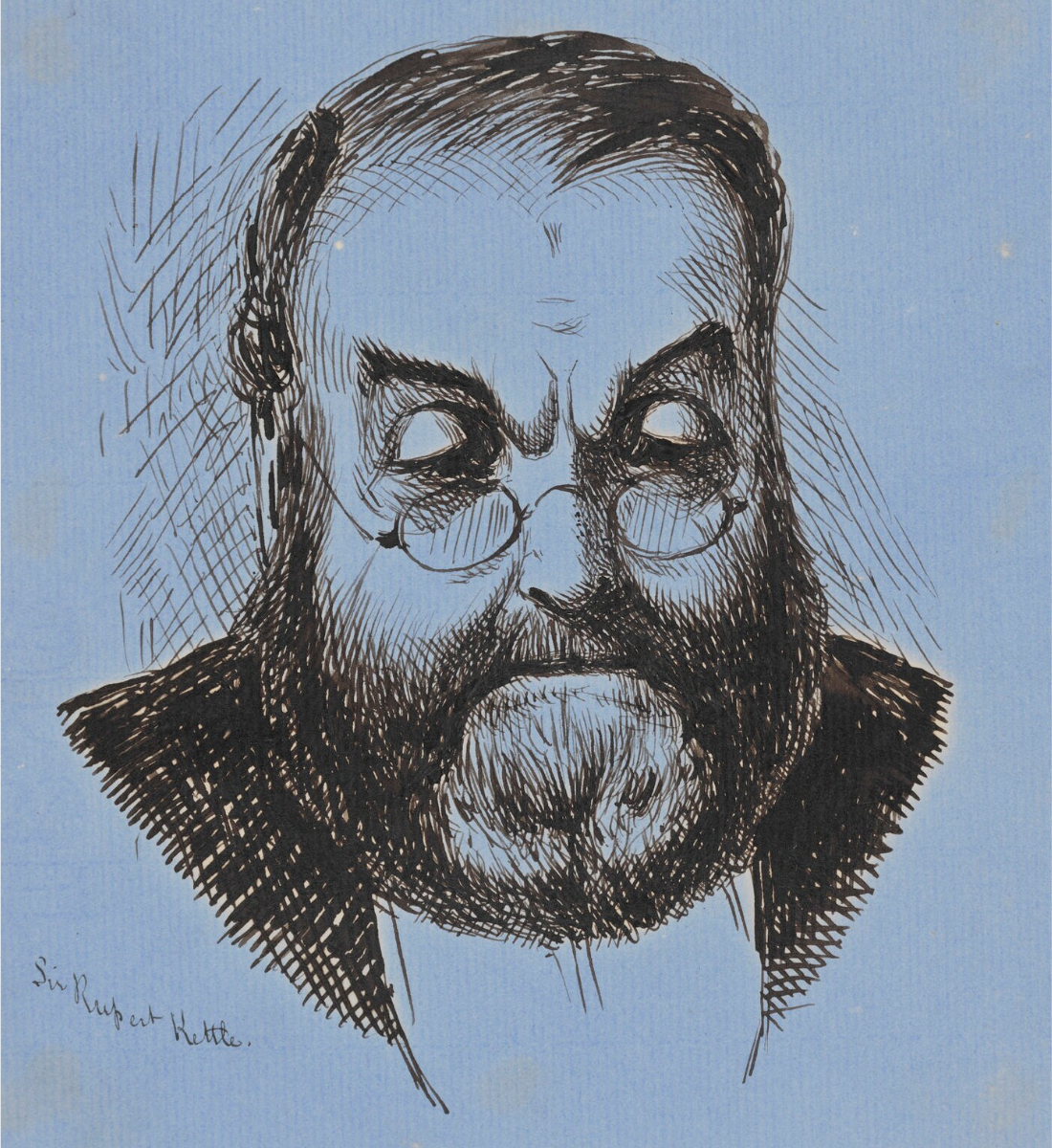
- Born: 9 January 1817; Birmingham
- Died: 6 October 1894 (aged 77); Wolverhampton
- Resting place: Merridale Cemetery
- Alma mater: Wolverhampton Grammar School
- Occupation: Lawyer, arbitrator, judge, painter, barrister

Sir Rupert Alfred Kettle (9 January 1817 – 6 October 1894) was an English barrister and county court judge, involved in arbitration of trade disputes.

== Life ==
Kettle was born at Birmingham on 9 January 1817, the fifth son of Thomas & Mary (née Twist) Kettle of Suffolk Street, Birmingham, a glass-stainer, fancy button and military ornament maker, and gilder. The family was descended from Henri Quitel, a Huguenot of Milhaud or Millau in Languedoc, who emigrated to Birmingham on the revocation of the edict of Nantes, and practised there the trade of glass-stainer. Kettle left Birmingham early in life and was articled to Richard Fryer, a Wolverhampton attorney.

Kettle entered the Middle Temple on 2 June 1842, was called to the bar on 6 June 1845, and obtained a practice on the Oxford circuit. In 1859, he was appointed judge of the Worcestershire county courts, and subsequently he acted as chairman of the standing committee for framing the rules for county courts. Kettle took an interest in industrial matters, and was called upon to arbitrate in disputes in the iron and coal trades. He was the first president of the Midland iron trade wages board, and used the influence which this office gave him to persuade masters and men to accept arbitration in their disputes. In 1864, after a strike in the building trade at Wolverhampton had lasted seventeen weeks, Kettle, on invitation from both sides, succeeded in arranging a settlement and ultimately in establishing at Wolverhampton a legally organised system of arbitration. If the delegates of the contending parties could not agree, an independent umpire should have power to make a final and legally binding award between them. The scheme spread to include a large part of the English building trade.

Kettle formed similar boards for the coal trade, the potteries, the Nottingham lace trade, the handmade paper trade, the ironstone trade, and other staples. He was styled the "Prince of Arbitrators", and on 1 December 1880 he was knighted "for his public services in establishing a system of arbitration between employers and employed." In 1890, the postmaster-general, Henry Cecil Raikes, consulted Kettle during the strike of the post-office employees.

On 24 November 1882, Kettle was elected a bencher of the Middle Temple. He was one of the senior magistrates and a deputy-lieutenant of Staffordshire, and he was assistant chairman of quarter sessions from 1866 to 1891. He was an artist of some ability, and several of his pictures were publicly exhibited. In 1892 he resigned his office of county court judge, finding that his labours in connection with arbitration occupied the greater part of his time.

In 1866, he built a summer residence called 'Glan-y-don' at Tywyn in Merionethshire in Wales, where we would spend a part of every summer.

He died at his residence, Merridale, Wolverhampton, on 6 October 1894, and was buried on 9 October with his wife, in the Wolverhampton cemetery.

== Family ==
On 18 December 1851 he married Mary (died 13 July 1884), only child and heiress of William Cooke of Merridale. They had a son.

== Legacy ==
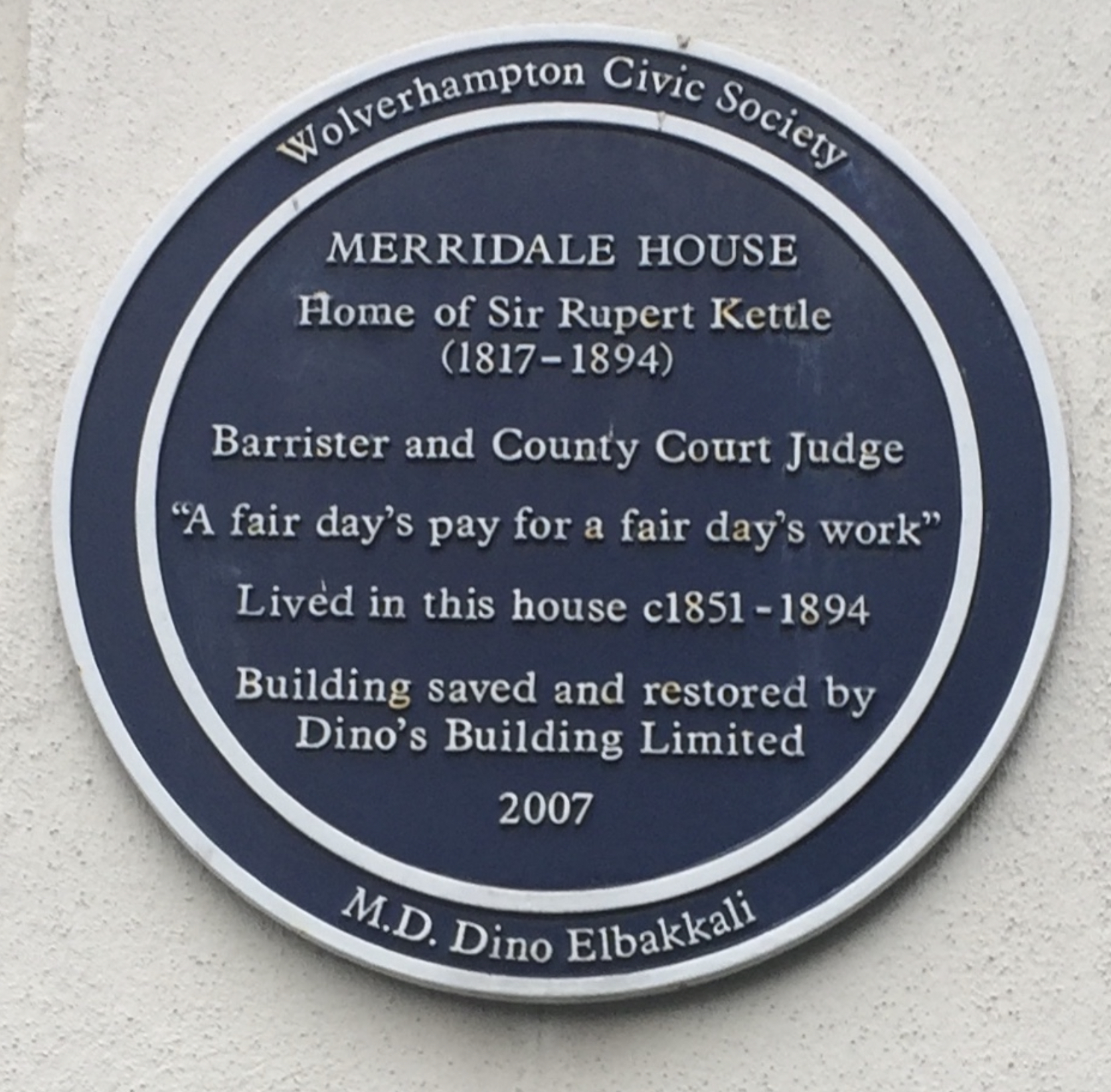
Blue plaque, Compton Road, Wolverhampton

A blue plaque in honour of Kettle was affixed to his former home, Merridale House, at 124 Compton Road, Wolverhampton, by Wolverhampton Civic Society in 2007. A plaque commemorating Kettle and his wife is in St. Peter's church in the city.

== Works ==
Kettle was the author of:

- A Note on Rating to the Poor ... for Unproductive Land, London, 1856.
- Strikes and Arbitrations, London, 1866.
- School Board Powers and School Board Duties, 1871.
- Masters and Men, London, 1871.
- Boards of Conciliation and Arbitration between Employers and Employed, 1871.
- Suggestions for diminishing the Number of Imprisonments, 1875.
- The Church in relation to Trades Unions, 1877.
