= No. 631 Squadron RAF =

Defunct flying squadron of the Royal Air Force

- Active: 1 December 1943 – 7 February 1949
- Country: United Kingdom
- Branch: Royal Air Force
- Role: anti-aircraft co-operation
- Part of: No. 70 Group RAF, Air Defence of Great Britain (43-44); No. 70 Group RAF, Fighter Command (44-49)

Insignia
- Squadron Codes: 6D (Dec 1943 – Feb 1949)

No. 631 Squadron RAF was an anti-aircraft co-operation squadron of the Royal Air Force from 1943 to 1949.

== History ==
The squadron was formed at RAF Towyn on 1 December 1943, from 1605 Flight and 1628 Flight for anti-aircraft co-operation duties, and operated a variety of aircraft in this role. On 10 May 1945 the squadron moved to RAF Llanbedr. It was disbanded on 11 February 1949 when redesignated No. 20 Squadron RAF.

== Aircraft operated ==
Aircraft operated by No. 631 Squadron RAF
| From | To | Aircraft | Version |
|---|---|---|---|
| December 1943 | February 1945 | Hawker Henley | Mk.II |
| March 1944 | July 1945 | Hawker Hurricane | Mk.IIc |
| August 1944 | July 1945 | Airspeed Oxford | |
| September 1944 | October 1944 | Miles Martinet | Mk.I |
| May 1945 | May 1947 | Vultee Vengeance | Mk.IV |
| June 1945 | July 1945 | Supermarine Spitfire | Mk.Vb |
| June 1945 | February 1949 | Supermarine Spitfire | Mk.XVI |
| January 1947 | February 1949 | Miles Martinet | Mk.I |
| August 1948 | February 1949 | De Havilland Vampire | F.1 |

== Squadron bases ==
Bases and airfields used by No. 631 Squadron RAF
| From | To | Name | Remark |
|---|---|---|---|
| 1 December 1943 | 10 May 1945 | RAF Towyn, Caernarfonshire, Wales | Det. at RAF Llanbedr, Gwynedd, Wales |
| 10 May 1945 | 11 February 1949 | RAF Llanbedr, Gwynedd, Wales | |

== See also ==
- List of Royal Air Force aircraft squadrons
