= Ysgol Craig y Deryn =

Coordinates: 52.625738°N 4.075405°W

- Llanegryn, LL36 9SG; Wales

Information
- Type: Welsh-medium State school
- Established: 2013
- Local authority: Gwynedd Council
- Head Teacher: Jennifer Bradbury
- Gender: Both
- Age: 3 to 11
- Website: ysgolcraigyderyn.org

Ysgol Craig y Deryn is a Welsh-medium primary school in Llanegryn in Gwynedd.

== General ==
The school is named after Craig yr Aderyn, a notable hill on the south bank of the River Dysynni near Llanfihangel-y-pennant. The form 'Craig y Deryn' reflects the local pronunciation.

As of 2021, the school had pupils pupils on roll. As of July 2024, over 39 per cent of pupils came from Welsh-speaking homes.

== History ==
The new school for the area (initially known as Ysgol Bro Dysynni) was built following the closure of the primary schools in the villages of Bryn-crug, Llanegryn and Llwyngwril. The school opened in September 2013.

== Building ==
The decision to build a new school was the subject of significant controversy, given that it led to the closure of three other schools in the area. The new school was also to be located in the Snowdonia National Park, which raised concerns regarding the appropriateness of a new building in a protected landscape. As a result, the school, designed by B3 Architects, was built to an innovative and environmentally sensitive design and was the outright winner of the Royal Town Planning Institute Wales Planning Award 2014. It was shortlisted for the 2015 Wales Gold Medal for Architecture.
