= Edward Ernest Hughes =

British historian

Edward Ernest Hughes (7 February 1877 – 23 December 1953) was the first professor of history at University College, Swansea.

== Life ==
Hughes was born on 7 February 1877 in Tywyn, Merionethshire, Wales. As a result of a childhood accident, he was blind in one eye and his other eye was damaged; he compensated by developing his memory and hearing. After studying at Bala Grammar School, he obtained a first-class degree in history from the University College of Wales, Aberystwyth in 1898. He then obtained a second-class honours degree in modern history from Jesus College, Oxford in 1902. He taught history in the boys' school in Llanelli, south Wales before his appointment as lecturer in history at University College, Cardiff, acting as professor during the illness of the incumbent. He lectured on Welsh history for the Workers' Educational Association in Glamorgan at a time when there was no extramural department at the university. He was regarded as a "gifted story-teller" and did much to popularise the study of Welsh history.

He moved to the University College, Swansea when it was founded in 1920 after being persuaded to do so by the principal, Franklin Sibly, who wanted a Welshman who understood what the new college would need to do in an industrial area. Hughes, who was the only Arts lecturer for a time, did much to bring the college to the public's attention. He raised funds by lecturing on Welsh history in the area and donating the proceeds to set up the library of the college. He was appointed the first professor of history in 1926, but continued to lecture (in both Welsh and English) outside the university to classes and societies. He required every student in his department to study some Welsh history, but he had Glyn Roberts (later to be Professor of Welsh History at University College, Bangor) to teach these classes, since Roberts had research qualifications that Hughes could not obtain with his worsening eyesight. Hughes taught the constitutional history of England in the Middle Ages and also Europe after the fall of Rome. He retired in 1944, and died on 23 December 1953.

Outside the university, he was chairman of the Swansea Drama Company (acting and producing as well), and of the Swansea Orpheus Musical Society. He was a council member and drama adjudicator of the National Eisteddfod, served on committees of the University of Wales and was a governor of the National Library of Wales. He also broadcast on the BBC in Wales.
