= Joseph David Jones =

Welsh composer and schoolmaster

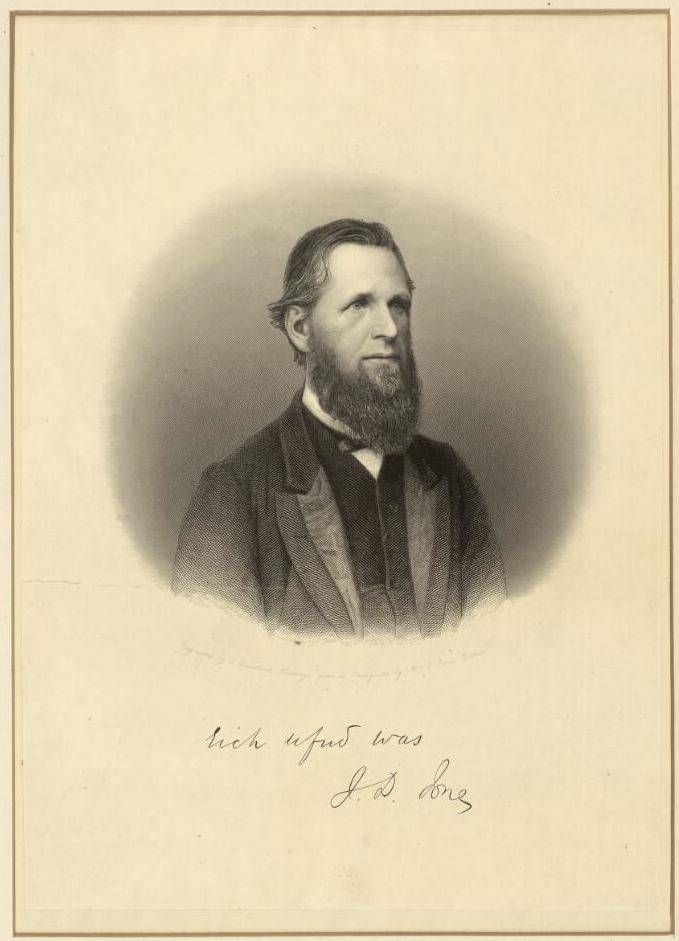
Portrait of J. D. Jones

Joseph David Jones (1827 – 17 September 1870) was a Welsh composer and schoolmaster, commonly known as J. D. Jones. He was the father of the politician and industrialist Sir Henry Haydn Jones and the renowned Congregationalist minister, John Daniel Jones (1865-1942).

Jones was head of Rhos Street School, and later founded the Clwyd Bank Academy, a private grammar school, at Ruthin. His compositions included songs and hymn tunes, the best-known of which is 'Capel y Ddôl'.

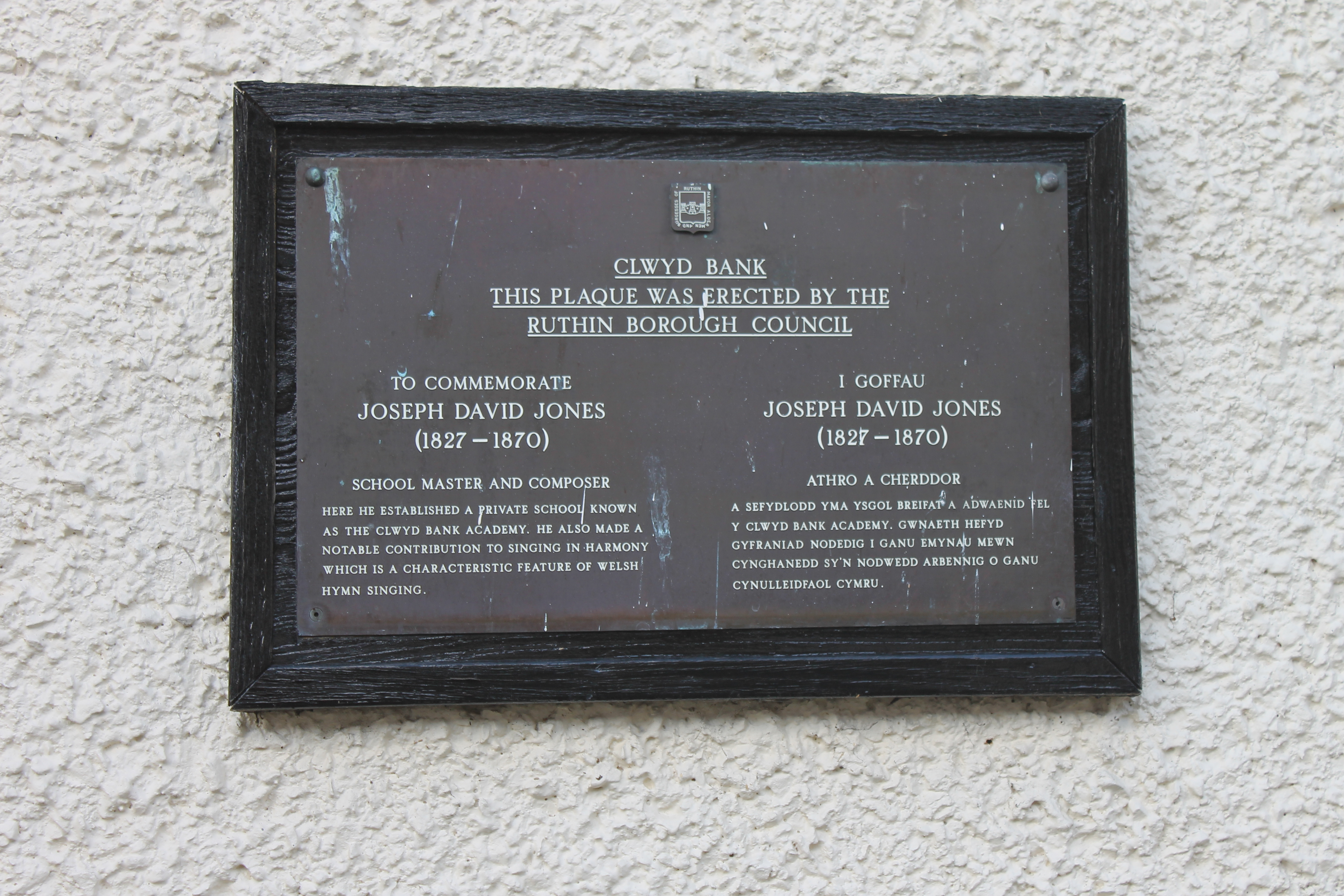
Commemorative plaque

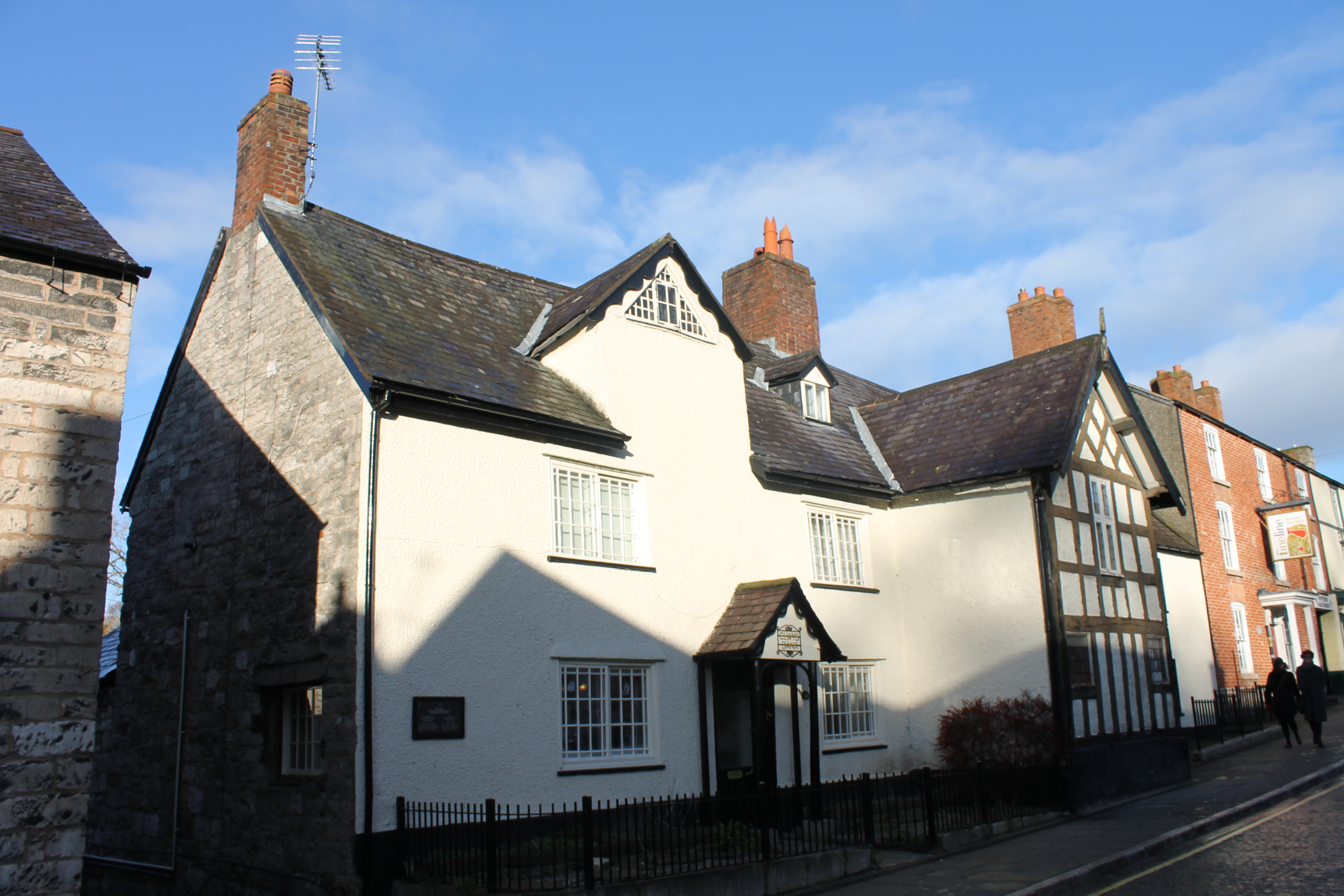
Clwyd Bank

== Sources ==
Notes

Bibliography

- Archives Network Wales
- DNB reference: R. M. J. Jones, ‘Jones, Joseph David (1827–1870)’, rev. David J. Golby, first published Sept 2004
