= Cadfan Stone =

Stone cross with the earliest known Old Welsh inscriptions

- Carreg Cadfan
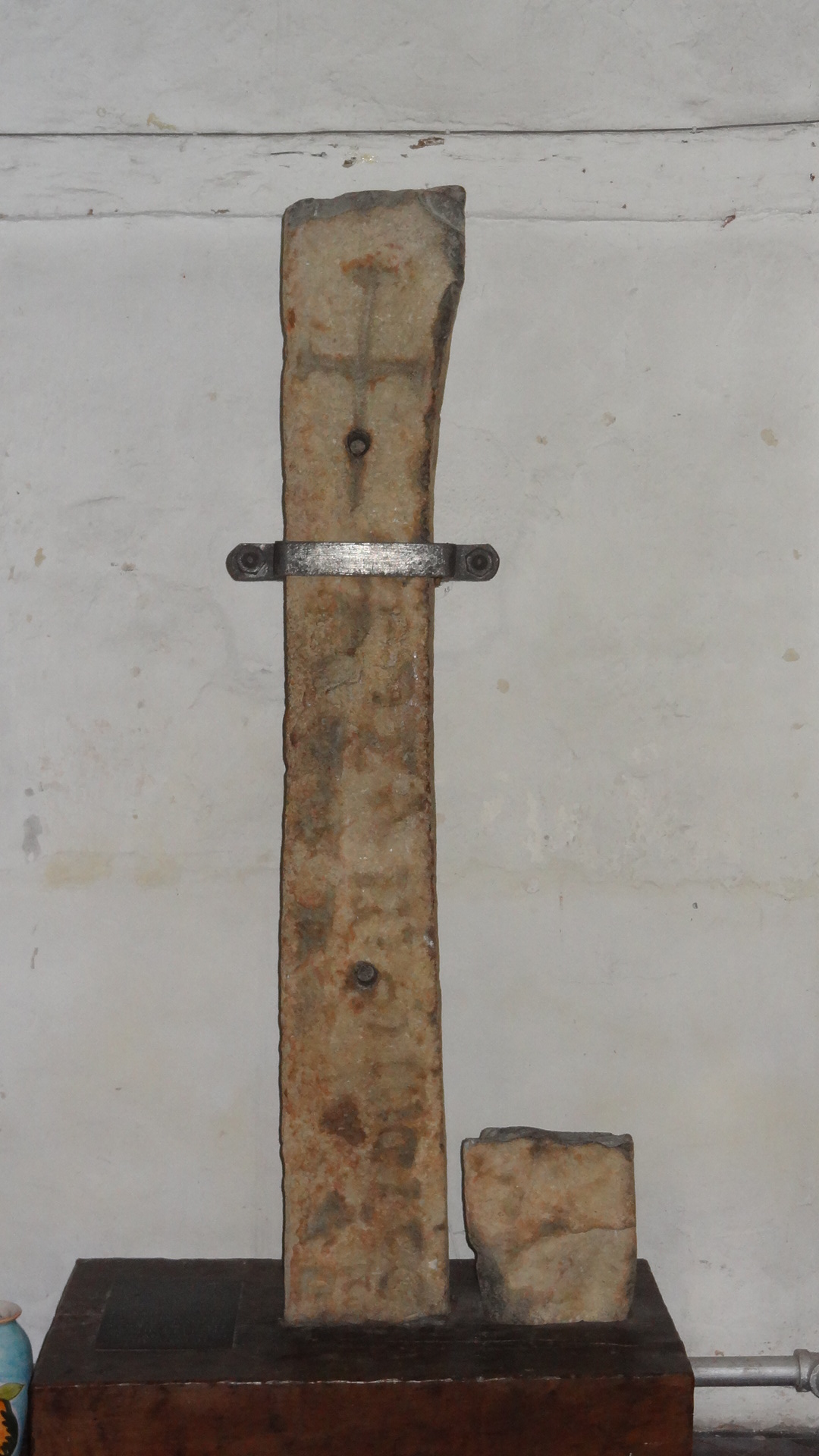
- Material: Stone
- Height: 2.3m originally (now 2.18m)
- Width: 0.25m
- Depth: 0.2m
- Period/culture: 7th-9th centuries
- Present location: St Cadfan's Church, Tywyn

The Cadfan Stone (Welsh: Carreg Cadfan) is a 7th–9th century stone that has the earliest known Welsh language inscription, specifically in Old Welsh. The stone is located inside St Cadfan's Church, Tywyn, Gwynedd.

== History ==
The stone was once thought to mark the grave of both Saint Cadfan and Cyngen Glodrydd, late king of Powys, roughly dating it to the first half of the sixth century. However more recent scholarship dates the inscriptions to far later: Ifor Williams dated them to the 8th century, and a late 7th century or early 8th century date was suggested by Kenneth H. Jackson. A date between the 7th century and the 9th century is suggested by Coflein, the website of the Royal Commission on the Ancient and Historical Monuments of Wales. Nancy Edwards assigned the stone firmly to the ninth century.

Despite its undoubted significance, the Cadfan Stone has been given relatively little attention from Welsh authors and poets. Exceptions include the poems 'Cofebion Tywyn' by Owain Owain and 'Y boen' by Myrddin ap Dafydd.

Originally the stone stood over 2.3 metres tall, but it now measures 2.18m tall by 0.25m and 0.2m.

== Interpretation ==
Below is the interpretation given in the most recent study of the stone (sides A, B, C and D) by Nancy Edwards.

A/D. Tengr(um)ui cimalted gu(reic) / Adgan // anterunc du But Marciau

'Tengrumui wedded wife of Adgan (lies) fairly near ( or very near) to Bud (and) Marciau (or But Marciau).'

A. m(ortci)c ar tr(i)

'The mortal remains of the three'

B/C. Cun ben Celen // tricet nitanam

'Cun woman (or wife of Celyn), a mortal wound remains.'

C. mort/cic pe/tuar

'The mortal remains of four'

== See also ==
- Archaeology of Wales
