= St Cadfan's Church, Tywyn =

St Cadfan's Church (Tywyn)
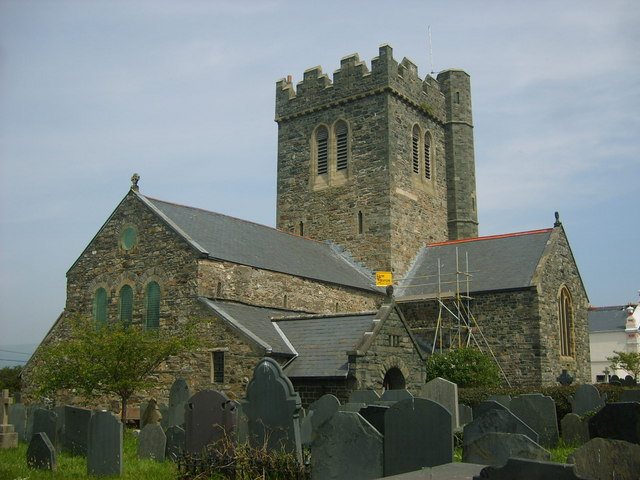
- St Cadfan's Church
- St Cadfan's Church (Tywyn)
- 52.5880°N 4.0853°W
- Location: Tywyn, Gwynedd
- Country: Wales
- Denomination: Anglican (Church in Wales)
- Previous denomination: Catholic Church (ended mid-16th century)

History
- Founder: Saint Cadfan

Architecture
- Architect: Medieval masons
- Style: Romanesque Architecture

Administration
- Province: Wales
- Diocese: Diocese of Bangor
- Archdeaconry: Meirionnydd
- Deanery: Ystumaner
- Parish: Tywyn

St Cadfan's Church (Welsh: Eglwys Cadfan) is situated in Tywyn in the county of Gwynedd, formerly Merionethshire, Wales. It is dedicated to Saint Cadfan, who founded a clas (ecclesiastical settlement) at Tywyn in the 6th century.

The church is noted for its Romanesque architecture and for housing the Cadfan Stone, a stone cross dating from ninth century or earlier which is inscribed with the oldest known written Welsh.

Brut y Tywysogion states that the church was sacked by Vikings in 963, and during the twelfth century it was the subject of a memorable poem by Llywelyn Fardd (I). The earliest parts of the building date to the twelfth century, and it originally had a central tower, although this fell down in 1693.

The church houses two fourteenth-century monuments. One of the effigies is of an unknown priest in full Eucharistic vestments. The other is a military figure thought to be Gruffudd ab Adda (d. c. 1350) of Dôl-goch and Ynysymaengwyn. The effigy is known as the 'Crying Knight' due to a flaw in the stone at his right eye which becomes damp during wet weather, giving the impression of weeping.

The vicarage, which was built in the early 19th century, still stands on National Street. It is now a private house called 'Tŷ Cadfan Sant'. National Street (formerly Duck Street) was named after the National School, later Towyn Church School, which was once located on the street.
