= Barbara Romagnan =

French politician

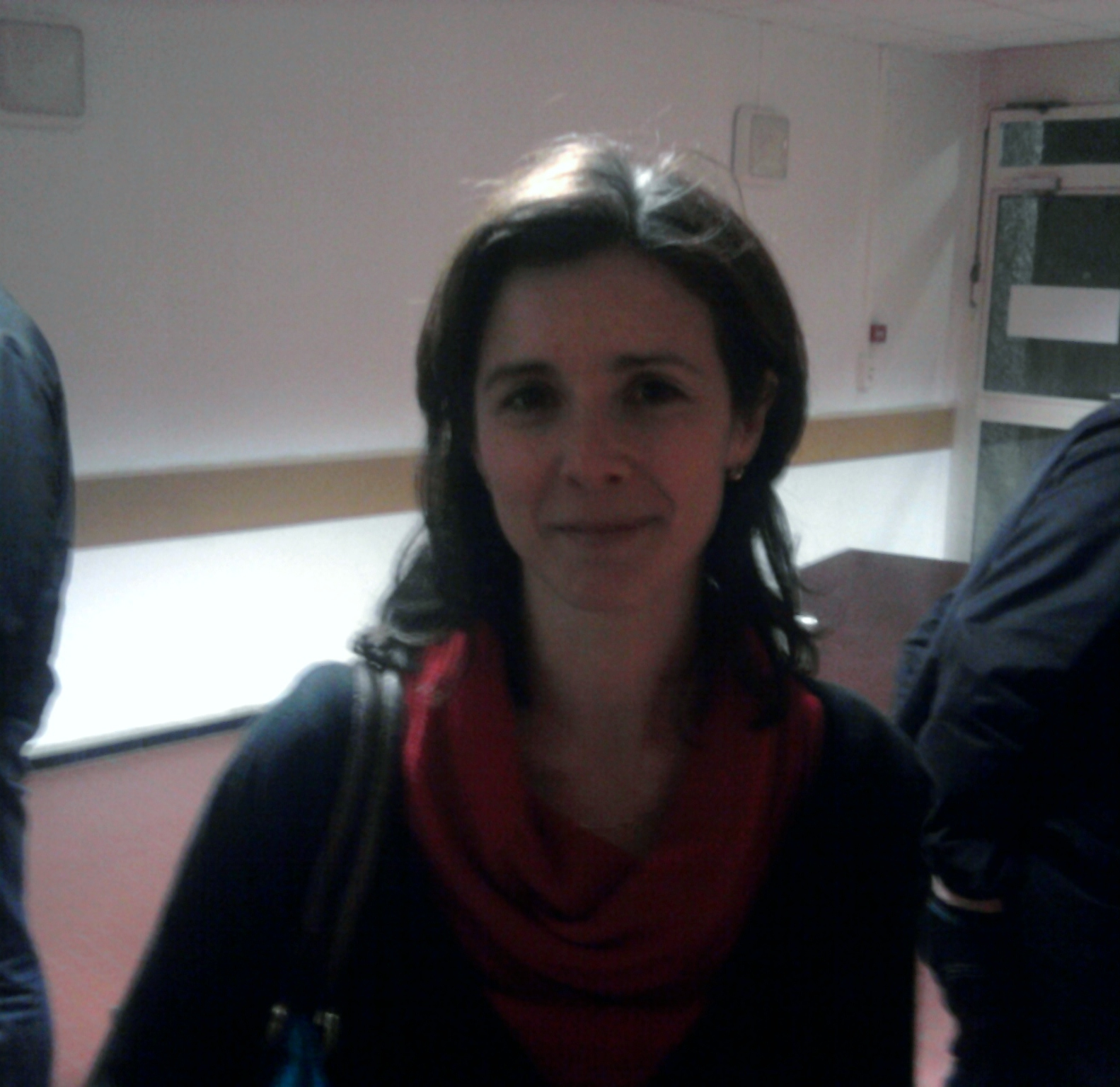
- Parliamentary group: Socialist Party

Deputy for Doubs's 1st constituency in the National Assembly of France
- In office 2012–2017
- Preceded by: Françoise Branget
- Succeeded by: Fannette Charvier

Personal details
- Born: April 25, 1974 (age 51) Annecy, Haute-Savoie

Barbara Romagnan is a teacher and a French politician who was a member of the Socialist Party since 1995. She later joined the 1 July Movement.

== Biography ==
Barbara Romagnan was born 25 April 1974 in the city of Annecy. After studies in Lyon (Rhône) she obtained a doctorate in political science in 2003, with a thesis titled 'Do women do politics differently?' and she was a socialist and feminist activist. Romagnan taught philosophy at the Dannemarie-sur-Crète high school, and also taught medical-social sciences at Besançon. Since 2003, Romagnan has been a member of the national chamber of Socialist Party and was the national secretary for the reunification of the party, from 2005 to 2008. In March 2008, she was elected to the post of governor of the Canton of Besançon-Planoise. She was Deputy for Doubs's 1st constituency in the National Assembly of France from 2012 to 2017.

== See also ==
- Planoise
- Jean-Louis Fousseret

== Bibliography ==
- (in French) 2005 : Du sexe en politique - Thèse de science politique - Editions Jean-Claude Gawsewitch (réponse à la question : « les femmes font-elles de la politique autrement que les hommes ? »).
