= Canton of Besançon-Planoise =

Coordinates: 47.2500°N 6.0333°E

Besançon-Planoise
- Former canton
- Interactive map of Besançon-Planoise
- Country: France
- Region: Bourgogne-Franche-Comté
- Department: Doubs
- No. of communes: {{{nbcomm}}}
- Disbanded: 2015
- Area: 2.9 km^{2} (1.1 sq mi)
- Population (2012): 20,407
  - Density: 7,000/km^{2} (18,000/sq mi)

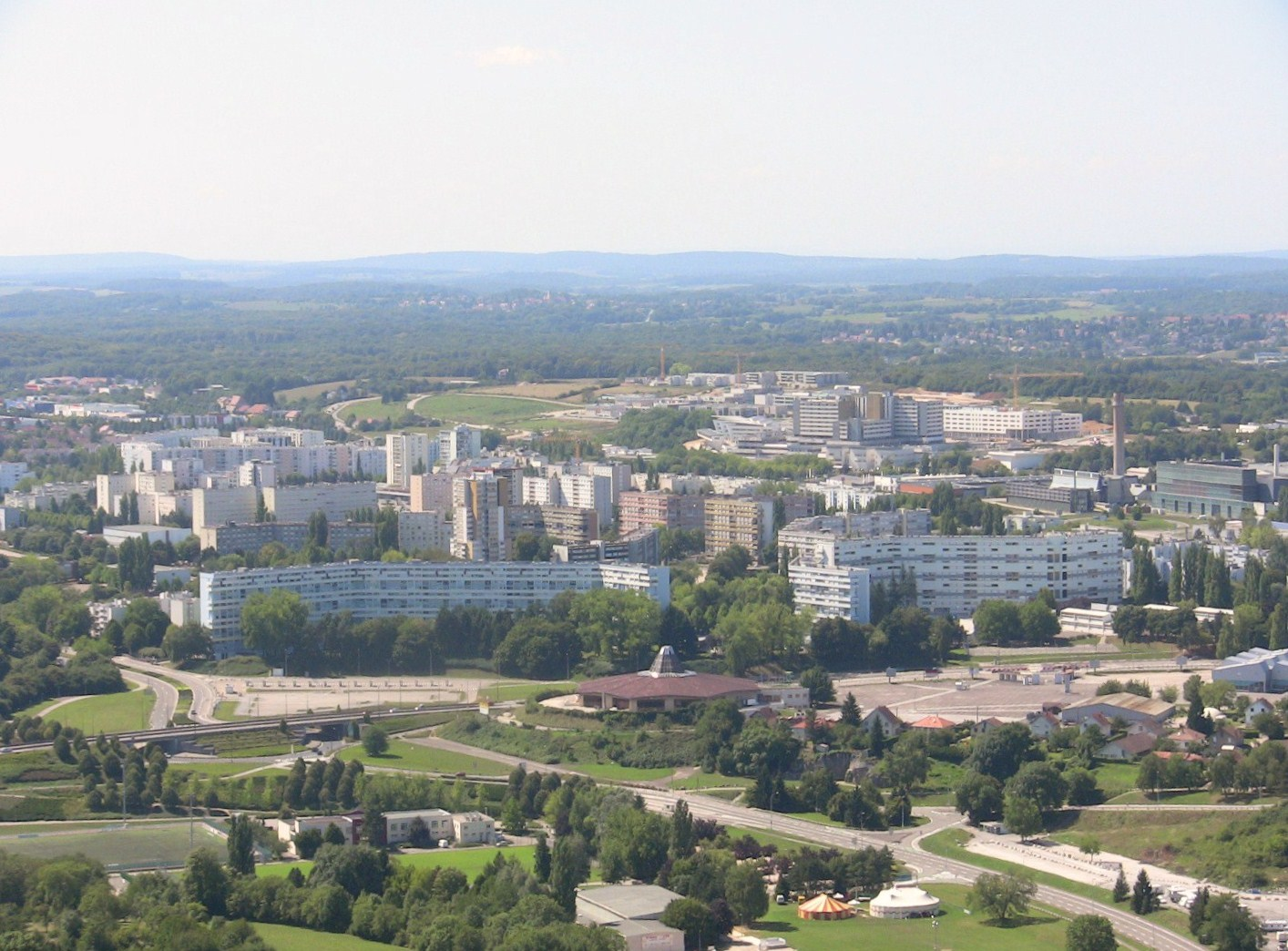
The area of Planoise

The Canton of Besançon-Planoise is a former administrative division in the departement of Doubs and in Franche-Comté region. It had 20,407 inhabitants (2012). It was disbanded following the French canton reorganisation which came into effect in March 2015. It consisted of three areas of Besançon: Planoise, Tilleroyes and Châteaufarine.

In 2008, Barbara Romagnan (PS) became representative of the canton with 70% of the votes, front of Martine Bultot (Far left) who obtained just 30% of the votes.

== History ==
Planoise, with 20,700 inhabitants is the bigger area of the canton of Besançon-Planoise.

Tilleroyes is a little area, located in the north of the city.

Châteaufarine is a commercial area, located in the west of Besançon and near Planoise.

== Politics ==
General Councillors
Election date	Name	Political group
The data dating before 1988 is not known.
March 2008	Jean-Louis Fousseret	PS
18 March 2001	Danièle Tétu	PS
16 March 2008	Barbara Romagnan	PS

== See also ==
- Arrondissement of Besançon
