= NASN School Nurse =

Peer-reviewed nursing journal

- Discipline: School nursing
- Language: English
- Edited by: Cynthia Galemore

Publication details
- History: 2001-present
- Publisher: SAGE Publications
- Frequency: Bimonthly

Standard abbreviations
- ISO 4: NASN Sch. Nurse

Indexing
- ISSN: 1942-602X (print); 1942-6038 (web)
- LCCN: 2008215440
- OCLC no.: 476309559

Links
- Journal homepage; Online access; Online archive

NASN School Nurse is an American bimonthly peer-reviewed nursing journal that covers the field of school nursing. The editor-in-chief is Cynthia Galemore. It was established in 2001 and is currently published by SAGE Publications in association with the American National Association of School Nurses. The editorial board selects issue themes for feature articles while also providing regular sections such as asthma/allergies, diabetes/endocrine, healthy lifestyles, immunizations/infectious disease, political/legal issues, screenings/referral, and special needs.

== Abstracting and indexing ==
The journal is abstracted and indexed in:

- CINAHL
- EMBASE
- MEDLINE/PubMed
- SafetyLit
- Scopus
