= Laurent Croizier =

French politician

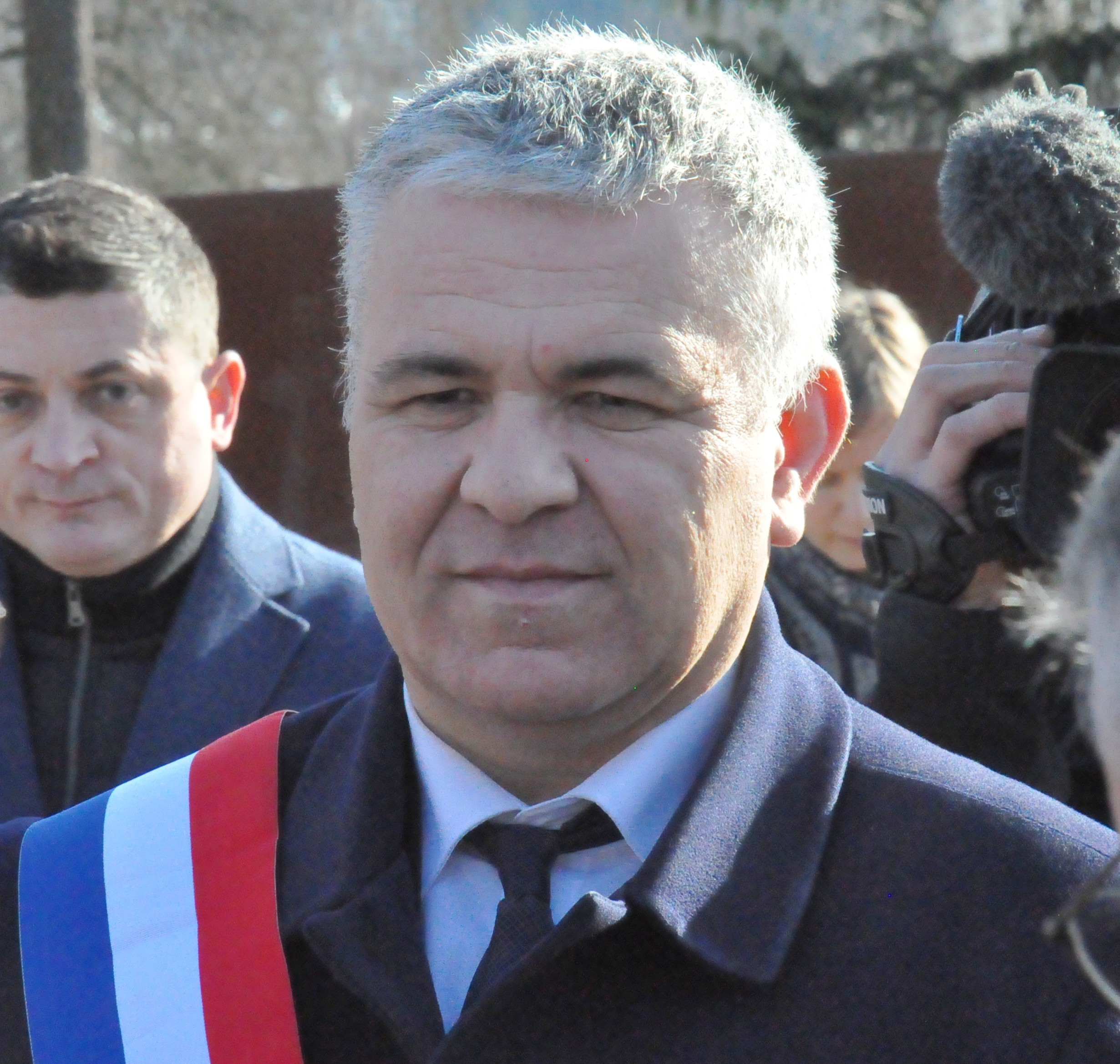
- Appointed by: June 22, 2022
- Preceded by: Fannette Charvier
- Constituency: Doubs's 1st constituency

Personal details
- Born: 29 January 1975 (age 50) Besançon (Doubs), France
- Party: Democratic Movement
- Occupation: School teacher

Laurent Croizier, born January 29, 1975, in Besançon (Doubs), is a French politician.

Involved with the Mouvement démocrate (MoDem) since 2012, he was elected Besançon municipal councilor and Grand Besançon Métropole community councilor in 2014. He was re-elected in the 2020 municipal elections.

In the 2022 legislative elections, he was elected deputy for the 1st constituency of Doubs.

== Biography ==
Laurent Croizier was born of a nurse mother and a railway worker father. He grew up in a rural environment in Roulans, Doubs, before moving to Besançon as a teenager. He is married with two children.

He obtained a scientific baccalaureate from the Lycée Jules-Haag in Besançon and continued his studies in higher education at the Besançon Faculty of Science, where he obtained a bachelor's degree in physics and chemistry.

He began his professional career as a school teacher in the French Ministry of Education.

=== Political career ===
==== Local mandates ====
Laurent Croizier has sat in opposition on the Besançon city council and on the Grand Besançon Métropole community council since 2014. In the 2020 municipal elections, the Mouvement démocrate du Doubs, which he chairs, has formed a local alliance in Besançon with the La République en marche party. The alliance, led by deputy candidate Éric Alauzet, lost in the second round to the left-wing coalition. However, he was re-elected city councillor and community councillor.

==== Member of Parliament for the 1st constituency of Doubs ====
In June 2022, Laurent Croizier was elected deputy for the 1st constituency of Doubs with 51.88% of the vote, ahead of his opponent from La France Insoumise who received 48.12% of the vote.

Supported by the presidential majority, he was elected under the Mouvement démocrate label.

==== Associative commitments ====
Laurent Croizier was sports coach and director of the training center at the Besançon professional basketball club (BBC).
