= K–12 education in the United States =

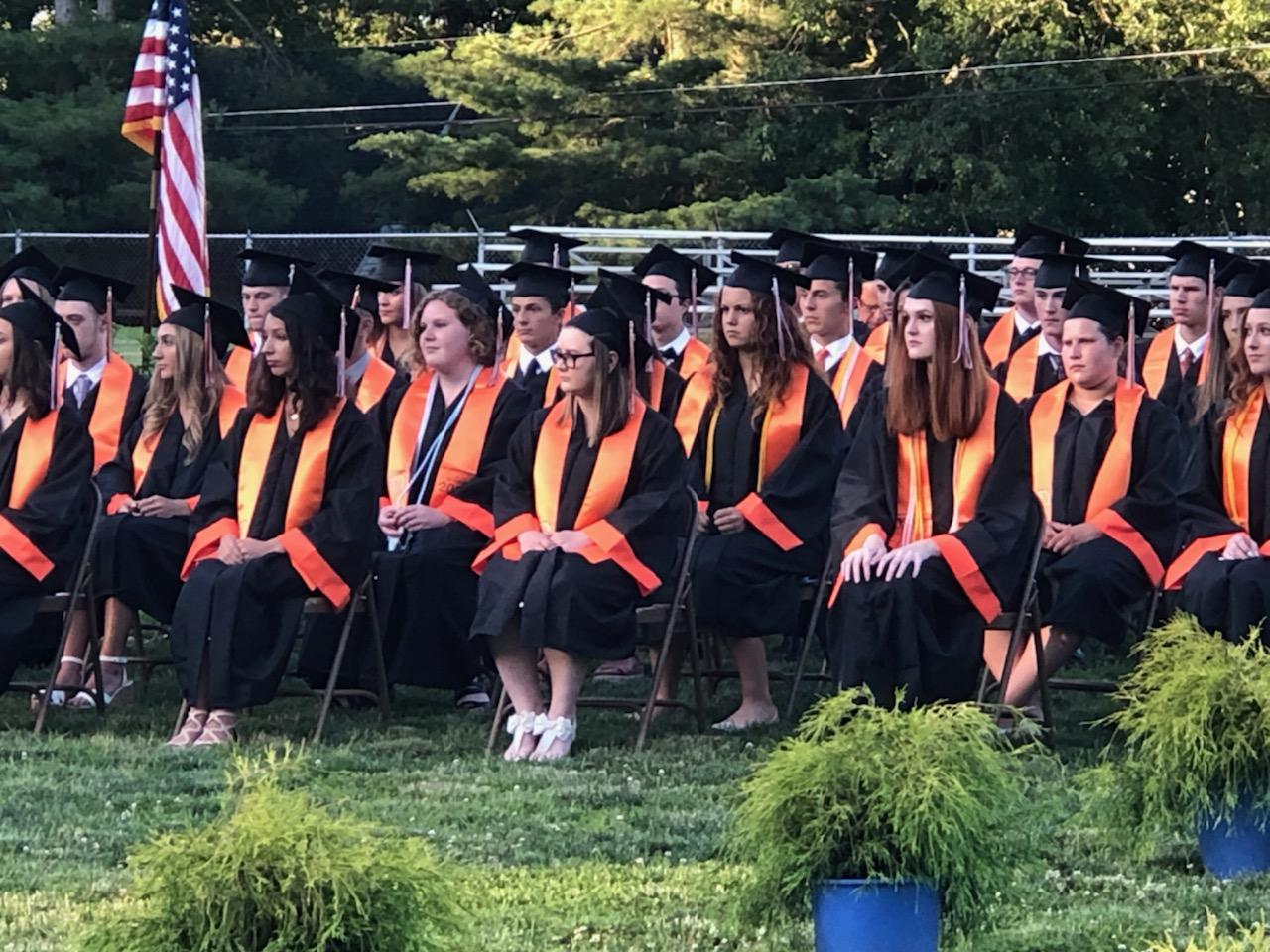
The 2019 graduation ceremony at Pitman High School in Pitman, New Jersey

K–12 education in the United States includes primary education starting in kindergarten, and secondary education ending in grade 12. Government-funded free schools are generally provided for these grades, but private schools and homeschooling are also possible. Most children begin elementary education with kindergarten (usually five to six years old) and finish secondary education with twelfth grade (usually 17–18 years old). In some cases, pupils may be promoted beyond the next regular grade. Parents may also choose to educate their own children at home; 1.7% of children are educated in this manner.

In 2010, American students ranked 17th in the world. The Organisation for Economic Co-operation and Development (OECD) says that this is due to focusing on the low end of performers. All of the recent gains have been made, deliberately, at the low end of the socioeconomic scale and among the lowest achievers.

About half of the states encourage schools to make their students recite the Pledge of Allegiance to the flag daily.

== Transportation ==
Transporting students to and from school is a major concern for most school districts. School buses provide the largest mass transit program in the country, 8.8 billion trips per year. Non-school transit buses give 5.2 billion trips annually. Around 440,000 yellow school buses carry over 24 million students to and from schools. In 1971, the Supreme Court ruled unanimously that forced busing of students may be ordered to achieve racial desegregation. This ruling resulted in a white flight from the inner cities which largely diluted the intent of the order. This flight had other, non-educational ramifications as well. Integration took place in most schools, though de facto segregation often determined the composition of the student body. By the 1990s, most areas of the country had been released from mandatory busing.

School start times are computed with busing in mind. There are often three start times: for elementary, for middle and junior high school, and for high school. One school district computed its cost per bus (without the driver) at $20,575 annually. It assumed a model where the average driver drove 80 miles per day. A driver was presumed to cost $.62 per mile (1.6 km). Elementary schools started at 7:30 am, middle schools and junior high school started at 8:30, and high schools at 8:15. While elementary school started earlier, they also finish earlier, at 2:30 pm, middle schools at 3:30, and high schools at 3:20. All school districts establish their own times and means of transportation within guidelines set by their own states.

== Grade placement ==
Schools use several methods to determine grade placement. One method involves placing students in a grade based on a child's birthday. Cut-off dates based on the child's birthday determine placement in either a higher or lower grade level. For example, if the school's cut-off date is September 1, and an incoming student's birthday is August 2, then this student would be placed in a higher grade level. If the student is in high school, this could mean that the student gets placed in 11th grade instead of 10th because of their birthday. The content each grade aligns with age and academic goals for the expected age of the students. Generally a student is expected to advance a grade each year K–12; however, if a student under-performs, they may retake that grade, while students who perform at a level beyond their next-higher grade may advance by two grades instead of one.

== Primary education ==
Historically, in the United States, local public control (and private alternatives) have allowed for some variation in the organization of schools. Elementary school includes kindergarten through fifth grade or sixth grade (sometimes to fourth grade or eighth grade). Basic subjects are taught in elementary school, and students often remain in one classroom throughout the school day, except for specialized programs, such as physical education, library, music, and art classes. There are (as of 2001) about 3.6 million children in each grade in the United States.

Typically, the curriculum in public elementary education is determined by individual school districts or county school system. The school district selects curriculum guides and textbooks that reflect a state's learning standards and benchmarks for a given grade level. The most recent curriculum that has been adopted by most states is Common Core. Learning Standards are the goals by which states and school districts must meet adequate yearly progress (AYP) as mandated by No Child Left Behind (NCLB). This description of school governance is simplistic at best, however, and school systems vary widely not only in the way curricular decisions are made but also in how teaching and learning take place. Some states or school districts impose more top-down mandates than others. In others, teachers play a significant role in curriculum design and there are few top-down mandates. Curricular decisions within private schools are often made differently from in public schools, and in most cases without consideration of NCLB.

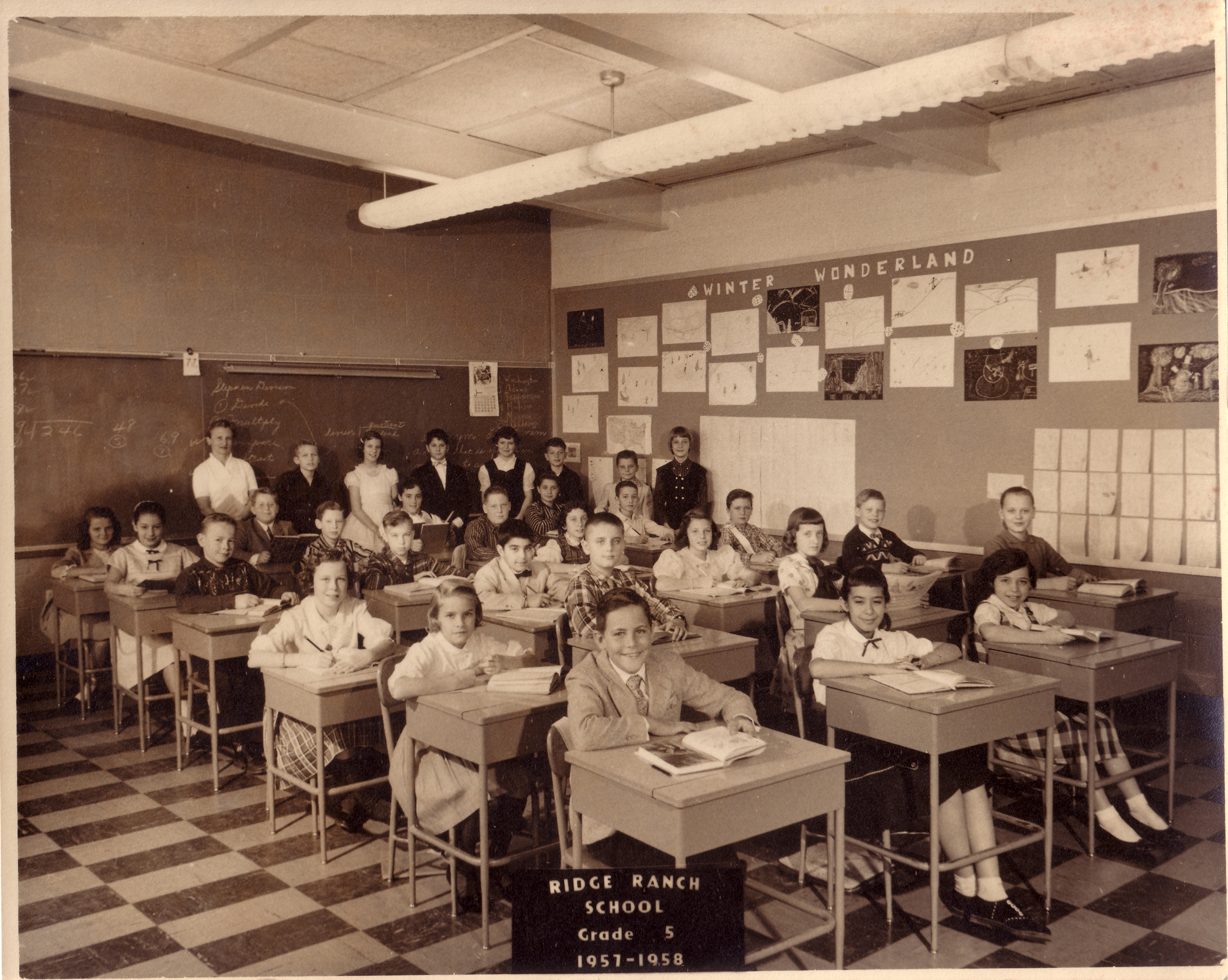
A fifth-grade class in Paramus, New Jersey, c. 1957

Public elementary school teachers typically instruct between twenty and thirty students. A typical classroom will include children with a range of learning needs or abilities, from those identified as having special needs of the kinds listed in the Individuals with Disabilities Act IDEA to those that are cognitively, athletically or artistically disabled. At times, an individual school district identifies areas of need within the curriculum. Teachers and advisory administrators form committees to develop supplemental materials to support learning for diverse learners and to identify enrichment for textbooks. There are special education teachers working with the identified students. Many school districts post information about the curriculum and supplemental materials on websites for public access. In general, a student learns basic arithmetic and sometimes rudimentary algebra in mathematics, English proficiency (such as basic grammar, spelling, and vocabulary), and fundamentals of other subjects. Learning standards are identified for all areas of a curriculum by individual States, including those for mathematics, social studies, science, physical development, the fine arts, and reading. While the concept of State Learning standards has been around for some time, No Child Left Behind has mandated that standards exist at the State level.

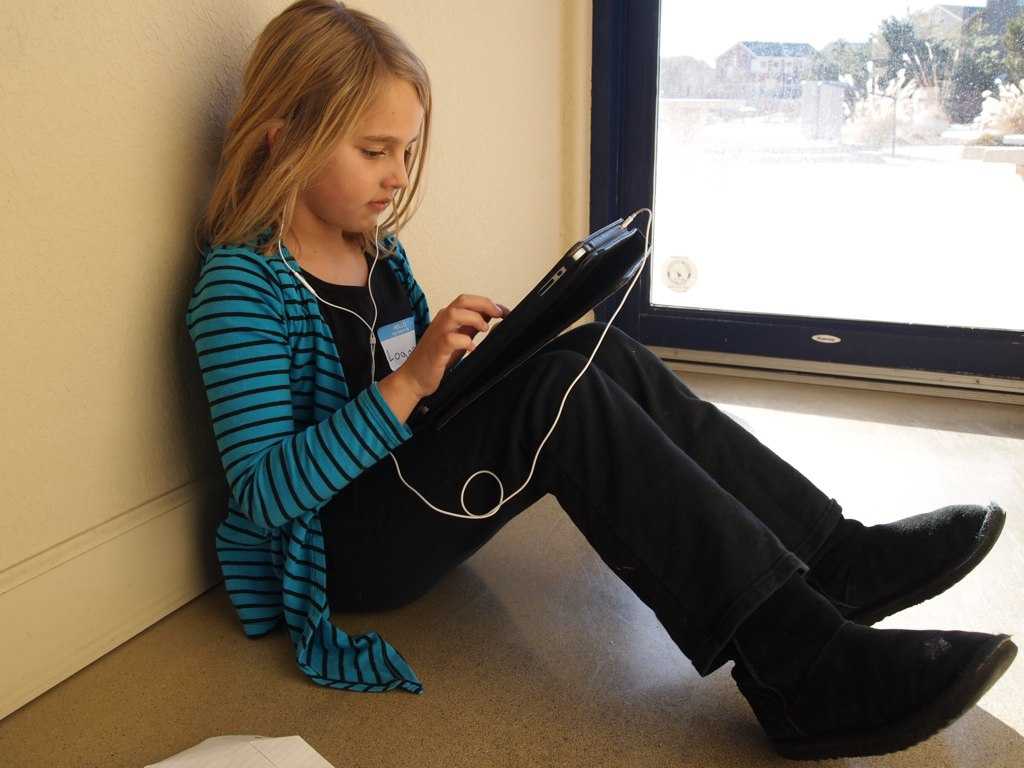
An elementary school student completing schoolwork on an iPad, 2011. Generation Z was among the first cohorts to use mobile devices in education.

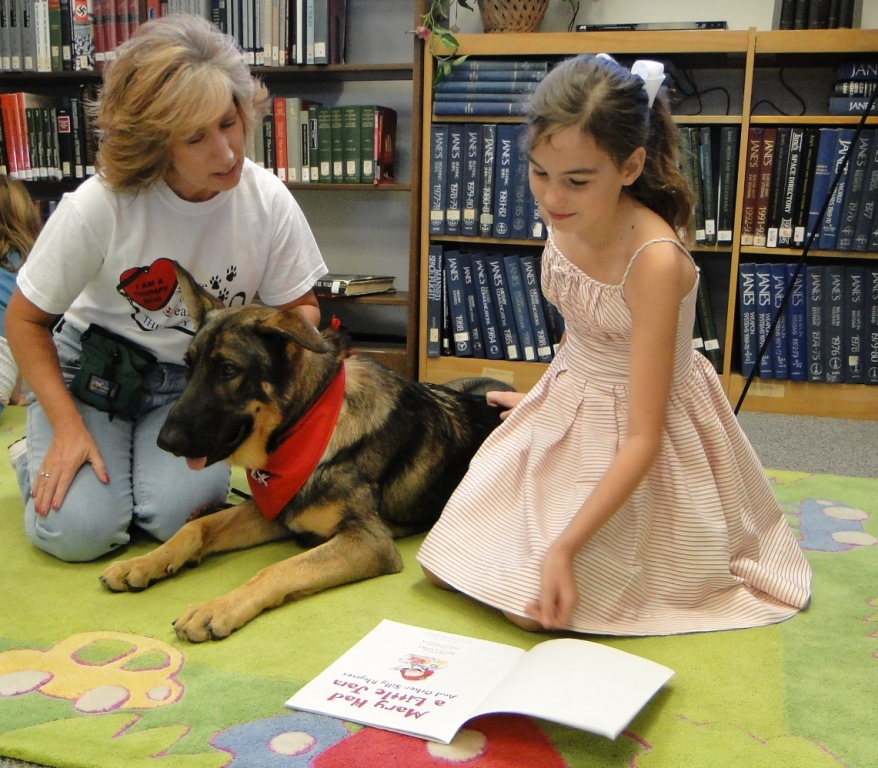
A 9-year-old student reading alongside a therapy dog. Those raised in the 2000s and 2010s are much less likely to read for pleasure than prior generations.

== Secondary education ==
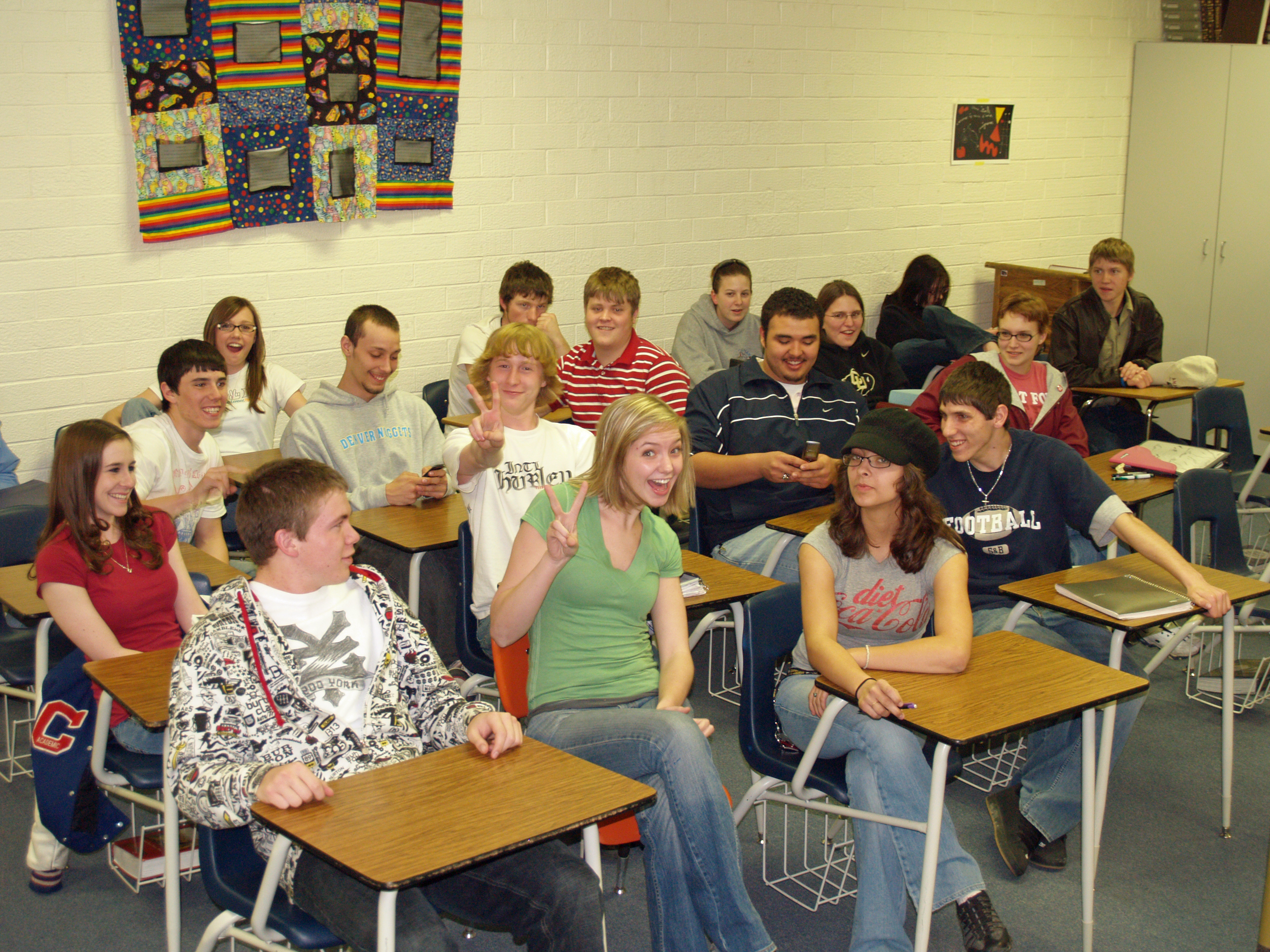
A high-school senior (twelfth grade) classroom in Calhan, Colorado, 2008

Secondary education is often divided into two phases, middle/junior high school and high school. Students in secondary schools often move to different classrooms for different subjects, and some schools enable some choice regarding what courses the student takes, though these choices are limited by factors such as governmental curriculum requirements.

"Middle school" (or "junior high school") has a variable range between districts. It usually includes sixth, seventh, and eighth grades (or other times only seventh and eighth), occasionally also includes ninth, and very occasionally fifth grades as well. High school (occasionally senior high school) includes grades 9 through 12. Students in these grades are commonly referred to as freshmen (grade 9), sophomores (grade 10), juniors (grade 11), and seniors (grade 12). At the high school level, students generally take a broad variety of classes without specializing in any particular subject. Students are generally required to take a broad range of mandatory subjects, but may choose additional subjects ("electives") to fill out their required hours of learning. High school grades normally are included in a student's official transcript for purposes such as college applications. Official transcripts usually include the ninth grade, whether it is taught in a middle school or a high school.

Each state sets minimum requirements for how many years of various mandatory subjects are required; these requirements vary widely, but generally include 2–4 years of each of: Science, Mathematics, English, Social sciences, Physical education; some years of a foreign language and some form of art education are often also required, as is a health curriculum in which students learn about anatomy, nutrition, first aid, sexuality, drug awareness, and birth control.

High schools provide vocational education, Honors, Advanced Placement (AP) or International Baccalaureate (IB) courses. These are special forms of honors classes where the curriculum is more challenging and lessons more aggressively paced than standard courses. Honors, AP or IB courses are usually taken during the 11th or 12th grade of high school, but may be taken as early as 9th grade. Some international schools offer international school leaving qualifications, to be studied for and awarded instead of or alongside of the high school diploma, Honors, Advanced Placement, or International Baccalaureate. Regular honors courses are more intense and faster-paced than typical college preparatory courses. AP and IB are similar, but conform to a curriculum which can provide credit equivalent to college-level classes.

=== Tracking (streaming) ===
Tracking is the practice of dividing students at the primary or secondary school level into classes on the basis of ability or achievement. One common use is to offer different curricula for students preparing for college and for those preparing for direct entry into technical schools or the workplace.

== Grading scale ==
In schools in the United States children are assessed throughout the school year by their teachers, and report cards are issued to parents at varying intervals. Generally, the scores for individual assignments and tests are recorded for each student in a grade book, along with the maximum number of points for each assignment. End-of-term or -year evaluations are most frequently given in the form of a letter grade on an A-F scale, whereby A is the best possible grade and F is a failing grade (most schools do not include the letter E in the assessment scale), or a numeric percentage. The Waldorf schools, most democratic schools, and some other private schools, give (often extensive) verbal characterizations of student progress rather than letter or number grades. Some school districts allow flexibility in grading scales at the Student information system level, allowing custom letters or symbols to be used (though transcripts must use traditional A-F letters)

Example grading scale
A				B			C			D			F
++	+		–	+		–	+		–	+		–	
Extra Credit (If Applicable)	100.0	99.0–97.0	96.9–94.1	94.0–87.0	86.9–83.0	82.9–80.0	79.9–77.0	76.9–73.0	72.9–70.0	69.9–67.0	66.9–63.0	62.9–60.0	59.9–0.0

Traditionally, colleges and universities tend to take on the formal letter grading scale, consisting of A, B, C, D, and F, as a way to indicate student performance. As a result of the COVID-19 pandemic, most Colleges and Universities were flooded with petitions proposing pass or fail options for students considering the difficulties with transitioning and managing during a state of emergency. Although most colleges and universities empathized with students expressing their frustration with transitioning online, transfer students implementing the pass or fail option are forecasted to have to retake the class. College credits for pass or fail classes have a low rate of being accepted by other colleges, forcing transfer students to sit through and pay for the same class they have already completed. While some colleges, such as the University of Wisconsin-Madison, Carnegie Mellon University, and North Carolina are permitting their students from weeks to months, to decide whether they will implement the pass or fail option offered by their college. While Harvard Medical School has previously been opposed to pass or fail grades, they have opened up to accepting pass grades.

== Standardized testing ==
U.S. states in blue had more seniors in the class of 2024 who took the SAT than the ACT while those in red had more seniors taking the ACT than the SAT.

Under the No Child Left Behind Act and Every Student Succeeds Acts, all American states must test students in public schools statewide to ensure that they are achieving the desired level of minimum education, such as on the New York Regents Examinations, the Florida Comprehensive Assessment Test (FCAT) and the Florida Standards Assessments (FSA) or the Massachusetts Comprehensive Assessment System (MCAS); students being educated at home or in private schools are not included. The act also required that students and schools show adequate yearly progress. This means they must show some improvement each year. When a student fails to make adequate yearly progress, NCLB mandated that remediation through summer school or tutoring be made available to a student in need of extra help. On December 10, 2015, President Barack Obama signed legislation replacing NCLB with the Every Student Succeeds Act (ESSA). However, the enactment of ESSA did not eliminate provisions relating to the periodic standardized tests given to students.

Academic performance impacts the perception of a school's educational program. Rural schools fare better than their urban counterparts in two key areas: test scores and drop-out rate. First, students in small schools performed equal to or better than their larger school counterparts. In addition, on the 2005 National Assessment of Education Progress, 4th and 8th-grade students scored as well or better in reading, science, and mathematics.

During high school, students (usually in 11th grade) may take one or more standardized tests depending on their post-secondary education preferences and their local graduation requirements. In theory, these tests evaluate the overall level of knowledge and learning aptitude of the students. The SAT and ACT are the most common standardized tests that students take when applying to college. A student may take the SAT, ACT, both, or neither depending upon the post-secondary institutions the student plans to apply to for admission. However, all these tests serve little to no purpose for students who do not move on to post-secondary education, so they can usually be skipped without affecting one's ability to graduate. Students with the highest test scores commonly choose the STEM subjects whereas those with the lowest scores picked agriculture or education.

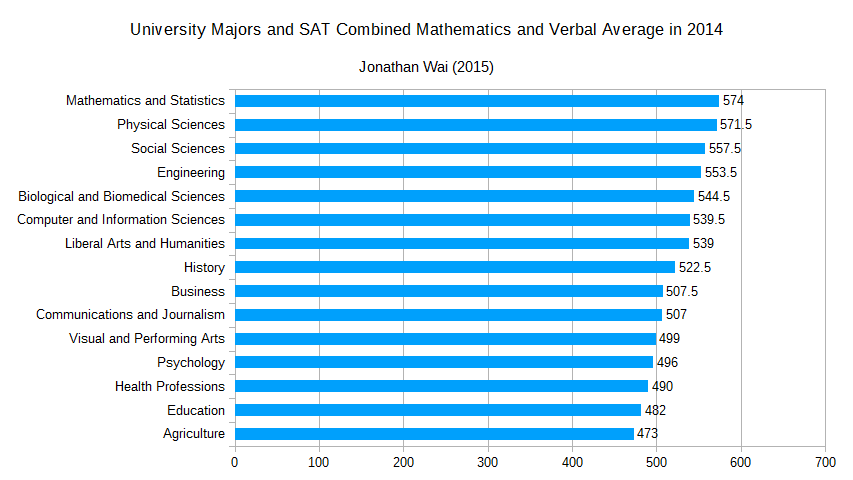

Standardized tests can be valuable objective check on grade inflation. In recent years, grade point averages (particularly in suburban schools) have been rising while SAT scores have been falling. Furthermore, standardized tests help prevent better-looking students from receiving higher marks. The SAT is correlated with general intelligence, and can be used as a proxy to estimate it, and to identify gifted students. Having a good working memory, the ability of knowledge integration, and low levels of test anxiety predicts high performance on the SAT. Suggestions for improving standardized testing include additional assessments of analytical, creative, and practical thinking, as well as three-dimensional reasoning ability.

== Extracurricular activities ==
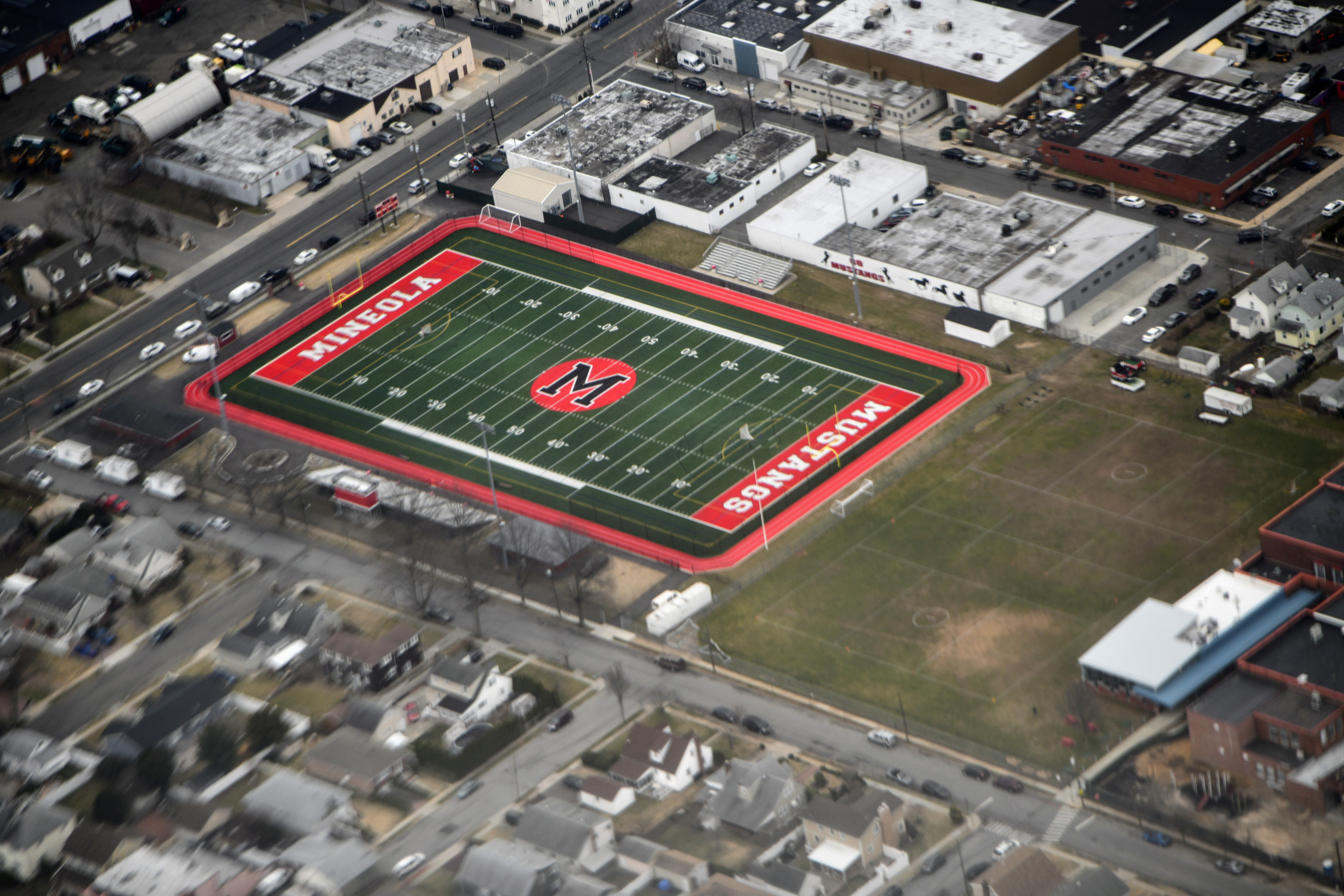
Examples of recreational fields, including a football field, in New York's Mineola High School.

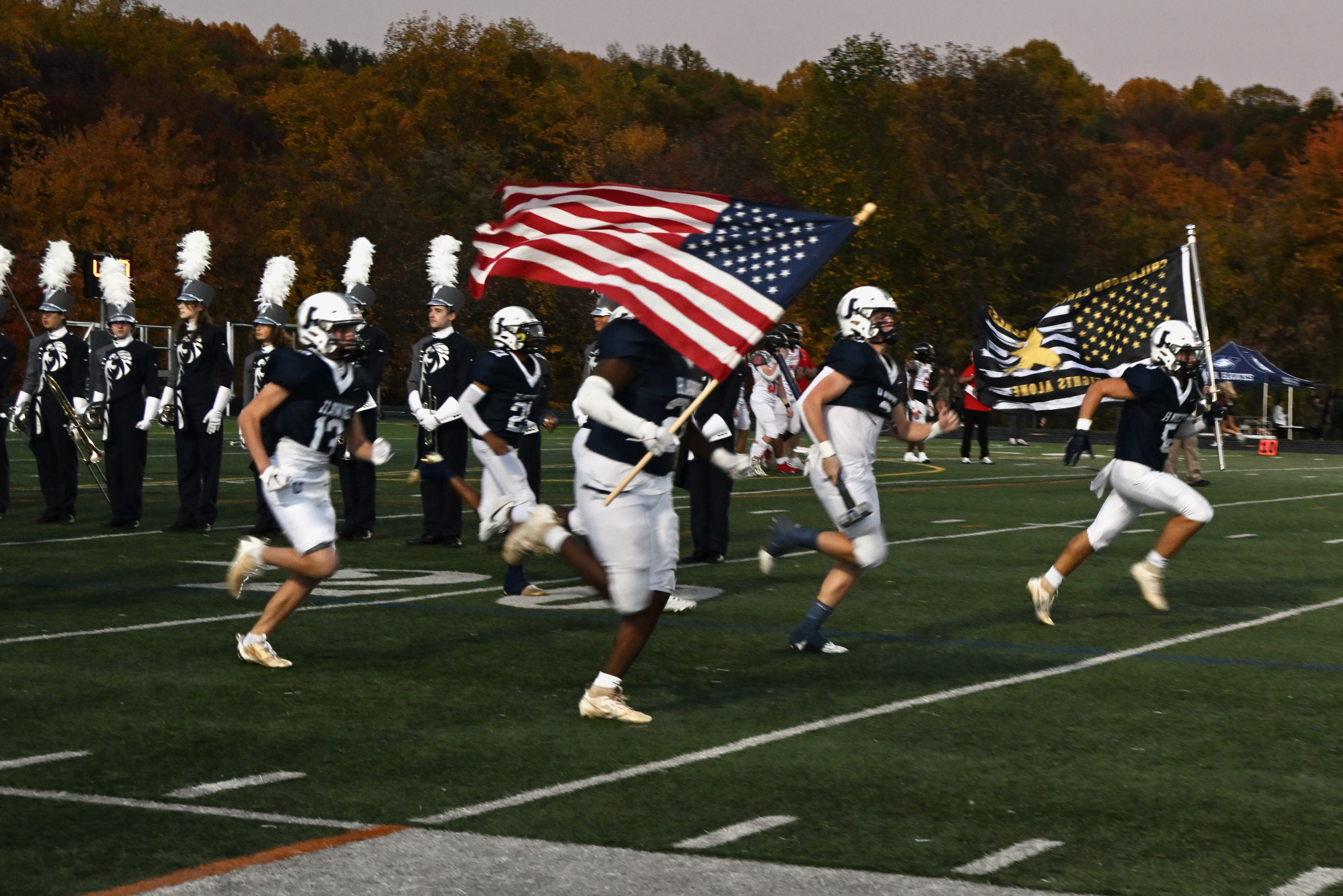
The football team and marching band of Urbana High School, 2023. Both are examples of extracurricular activities in schools.

A major characteristic of American schools is the high priority given to sports, clubs, and activities by the community, the parents, the schools, and the students themselves. Extracurricular activities are educational activities not falling within the scope of the regular curriculum but under the supervision of the school. Extracurriculars at the high school age (15–18) can be anything that doesn't require a high school credit or paid employment, but simply done out of pleasure or to also look good on a college transcript. Extracurricular activities for all ages can be categorized under clubs, art, culture and language, community, leadership, government, media, military, music, performing arts, religion, role play/fantasy, speech, sports, technology, and volunteer, all of which take place outside of school hours. These sorts of activities are put in place as other forms of teamwork, time management, goal setting, self-discovery, building self-esteem, relationship building, finding interests, and academics. These extracurricular activities and clubs can be sponsored by fundraising, or by the donation of parents who give towards the program in order for it to keep running. Students and Parents are also obligated to spend money on whatever supplies are necessary for this activity that are not provided for the school (sporting equipment, sporting attire, costumes, food, instruments). These activities can extend to large amounts of time outside the normal school day; home-schooled students, however, are not normally allowed to participate. Student participation in sports programs, drill teams, bands, and spirit groups can amount to hours of practices and performances. Most states have organizations that develop rules for competition between groups. These organizations are usually forced to implement time limits on hours practiced as a prerequisite for participation. Many schools also have non-varsity sports teams; however, these are usually afforded fewer resources and less attention.

Sports programs and their related games, especially football and basketball, are major events for American students and for larger schools can be a major source of funds for school districts.

High school athletic competitions often generate intense interest in the community.

In addition to sports, numerous non-athletic extracurricular activities are available in American schools, both public and private. Activities include Quizbowl, musical groups, marching bands, student government, school newspapers, science fairs, debate teams, and clubs focused on an academic area (such as the Spanish Club), community service interests (such as Key Club), or professional networking (such as Future Business Leaders of America or TLEEM).

== Compulsory education ==
Schooling is compulsory for all children in the United States, but the age range for which school attendance is required varies from state to state. Some states allow students to leave school between 14 and 17 with parental permission, before finishing high school; other states require students to stay in school until age 18. Children who do not comply with compulsory attendance laws without good cause are deemed to be truants, and they and their parents may be subject to various penalties under state law.

Around 523,000 students between the ages of 15 and 24 drop out of high school each year, a rate of 4.7 percent as of October 2017. In the United States, 75 percent of crimes are committed by high school dropouts. Around 60 percent of black dropouts end up spending time incarcerated. The incarceration rate for African-American male high school dropouts was about 50 times the national average as of 2010.

== Additional support needs ==
Students with special needs are typically taught by teachers with specialized training in adapting curricula. As of 2017, about 13% of U.S. students receive special education services.

According to the National Association of School Nurses, 5% of students in 2009 have a seizure disorder, another 5% have ADHD and 10% have mental or emotional disorders.

On January 25, 2013, the Office for Civil Rights of the U.S. Department of Education issued guidance, clarifying school districts' existing legal obligations to give disabled students an equal chance to compete in extracurricular sports alongside their able-bodied classmates.

=== Educating children with disabilities ===
The federal law, Individuals with Disabilities Education Act (IDEA) requires states to ensure that all government-run schools provide services to meet the individual needs of students with special needs, as defined by the law. All students with special needs are entitled to a free and appropriate public education (FAPE).

Schools meet with the parents or guardians to develop an Individualized Education Program that determines best placement for the child. Students must be placed in the least restrictive environment (LRE) that is appropriate for the student's needs.

In 2017, nationwide 67.1% of students with disabilities attending public schools graduated high school.

=== Criticism ===
At-risk students (those with educational needs that are not associated with a disability) are often placed in classes with students with minor emotional and social disabilities. Critics assert that placing at-risk students in the same classes as these disabled students may impede the educational progress of both the at-risk and the disabled students. Some research has refuted this assertion, and has suggested this approach increases the academic and behavioral skills of the entire student population.

=== Public and private schools ===
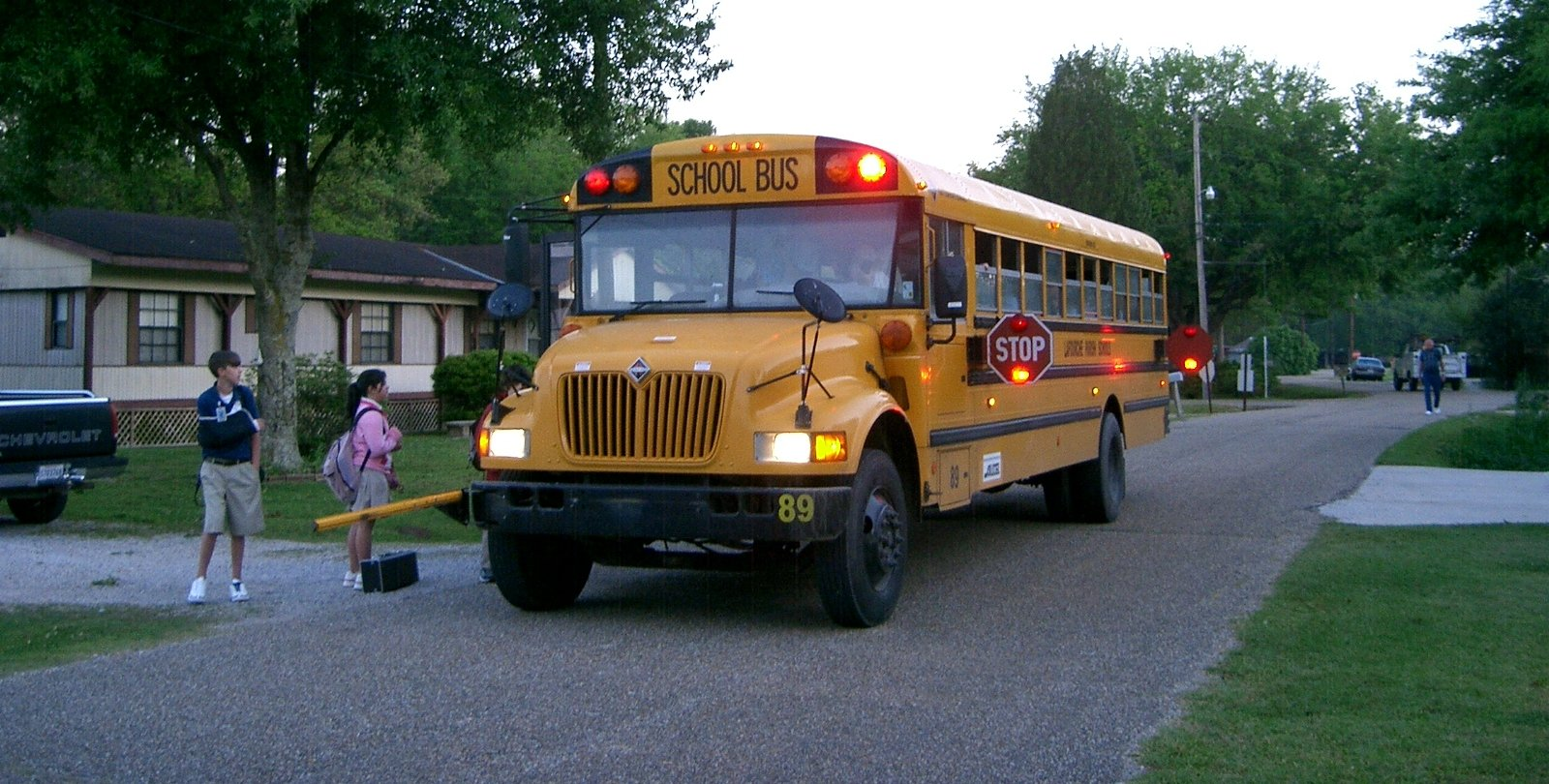
Children boarding a school bus in Thibodaux, Louisiana, 2006

In the United States, state and local governments have primary responsibility for education. The Federal Department of Education plays a role in standards-setting and education finance, and some primary and secondary schools, for the children of military employees, are run by the Department of Defense.

K–12 students in most areas have a choice between free tax-funded public schools, or privately funded private schools.

According to government data, one-tenth of students are enrolled in private schools. Approximately 85% of students enter the public schools, largely because they are tax-subsidized (tax burdens by school districts vary from area to area). School districts are usually separate from other local jurisdictions, with independent officials and budgets.

There are more than 14,000 school districts in the country, and more than $500 billion is spent each year on public primary and secondary education. States do not require reporting from their school districts to allow an analysis of efficiency of return on investment. The Center for American Progress commends Florida and Texas as the only two states that provide annual school-level productivity evaluations which report to the public how well school funds are being spent at the local level. This allows for a comparison of school districts within a state.

Public school systems are supported by a combination of local, state, and federal government funding. Because a large portion of school revenues come from local property taxes, public schools vary widely in the resources they have available per student. Class size also varies from one district to another. Curriculum decisions in public schools are made largely at the local and state levels; the federal government has limited influence. In most districts, a locally elected school board runs schools. The school board appoints an official called the superintendent of schools to manage the schools in the district.

Local property taxes for public school funding may have disadvantages depending on how wealthy or poor these cities may be. Some of the disadvantages may be not having the proper electives of students' interest or advanced placement courses to further the knowledge and education of these students. Cases such as these limit students and causes inequality in education because there is no easy way to gain access to those courses since the education system might not view them as necessary. The public education system does provide the classes needed to obtain a GED (General Education Development) and obtain a job or pursue higher education.

The largest public school system in the United States is in New York City, where more than one million students are taught in 1,200 separate public schools.

Admission to individual public schools is usually based on residency. To compensate for differences in school quality based on geography, school systems serving large cities and portions of large cities often have magnet schools that provide enrollment to a specified number of non-resident students in addition to serving all resident students. This special enrollment is usually decided by lottery with equal numbers of males and females chosen. Some magnet schools cater to gifted students or to students with special interests, such as the sciences or performing arts.

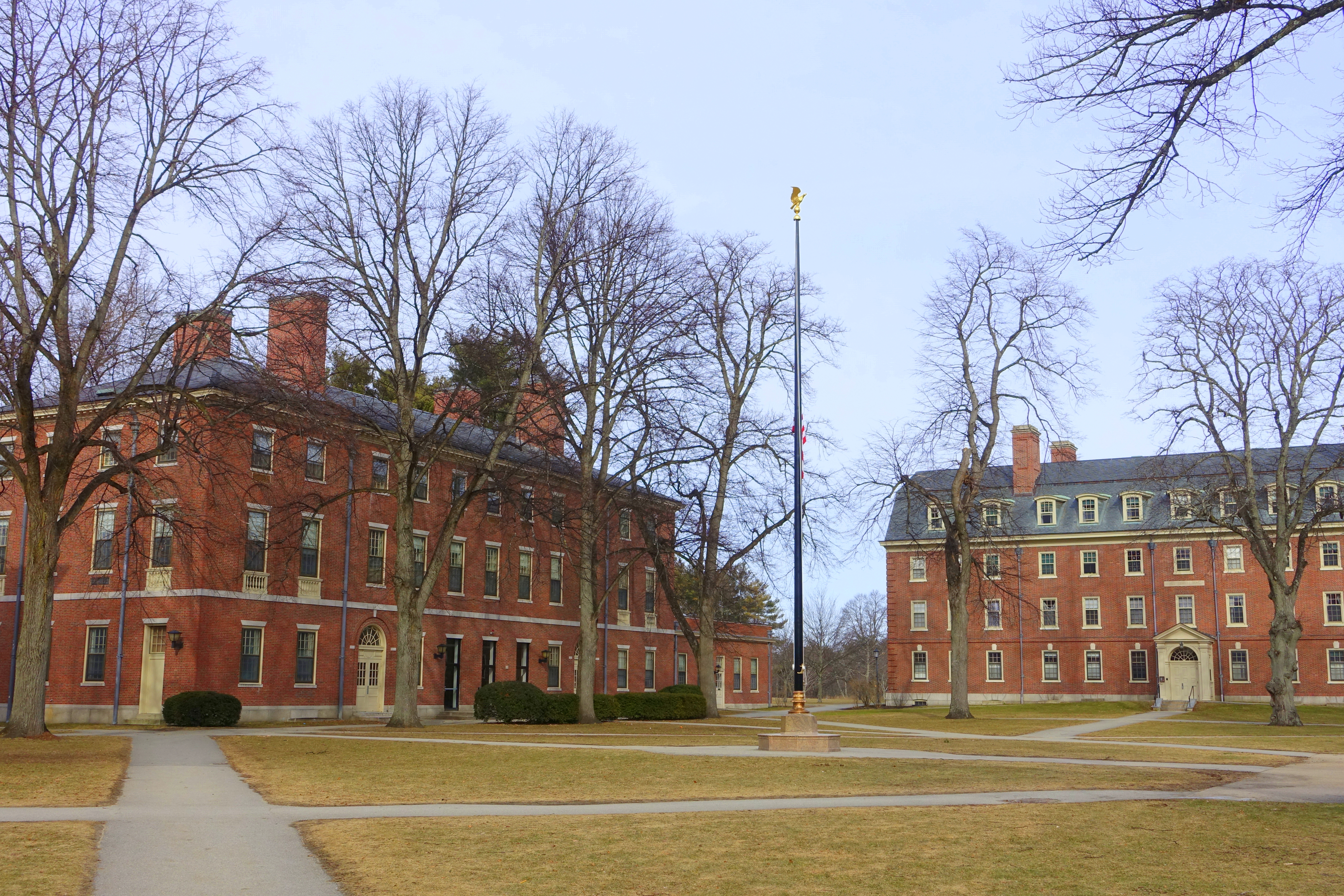
Phillips Academy Andover, an elite private secondary school in Massachusetts

Private schools in the United States include parochial schools (affiliated with religious denominations), non-profit independent schools, and for-profit private schools. Private schools charge varying rates depending on geographic location, the school's expenses, and the availability of funding from sources, other than tuition. For example, some churches partially subsidize private schools for their members. Some people have argued that when their child attends a private school, they should be able to take the funds that the public school no longer needs and apply that money towards private school tuition in the form of vouchers. This is the basis of the school choice movement.

In 2007, 5,072,451 students attended 33,740 private elementary and secondary schools. Of these, 74.5% were Caucasian non-Hispanic, 9.8% were African American, 9.6% were Hispanic, 5.4% were Asian or Pacific Islander, and 0.6% were American Indian. The average school size was 150.3 students. There were 456,266 teachers. The number of students per teacher was about 11. Of seniors in private schools in 2006–07, 65% went on to attend a four-year college.

Private schools have various missions: some cater to college-bound students seeking a competitive edge in the college admissions process; others are for gifted students, students with learning disabilities or other special needs, or students with specific religious affiliations. Some cater to families seeking a small school, with a nurturing, supportive environment. Unlike public school systems, private schools have no legal obligation to accept any interested student. Admission to some private schools is often highly selective.

An August 17, 2000 article by the Chicago Sun-Times refers to the Roman Catholic Archdiocese of Chicago Office of Catholic Schools as the largest private school system in the United States.

=== Teachers ===
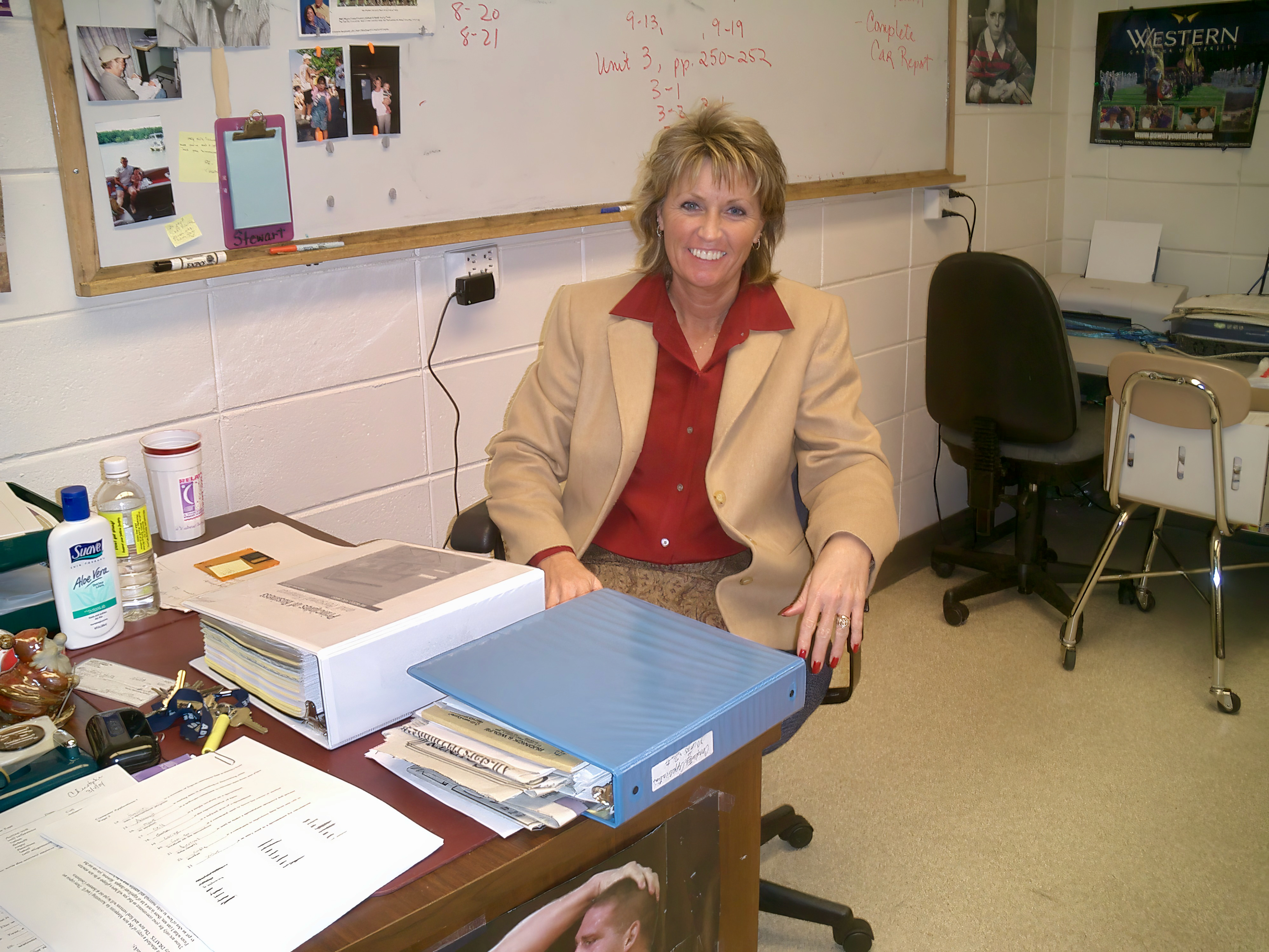
A public high school teacher in a classroom in North Carolina

Most states require that their school districts within the state teach for 180 days a year. Teachers worked from 35 to 46 hours a week, in a survey taken in 1993. In 2011, American teachers worked 1,097 hours in the classroom, the most of any industrialized nation measured by the OECD. They spent 1,913 hours a year on their work, just below the national average of 1,932 hours for all workers. In 2011, the average annual salary of a PreK–12 teacher was $55,040. To be certified to teach, public school teachers must obtain at least a bachelor's degree in their specified field and obtain a state certification. Some private schools may want state certification, but others may be more relaxed with it. To add to this, some Private schools might have other specialized or religious training they require.

=== Charter schools ===
The charter school movement began in 1990 and has spread rapidly in the United States, members, parents, teachers, and students to allow for the "expression of diverse teaching philosophies and cultural and social life styles."

=== Homeschooling ===
In 2014, approximately 1.5 million children were homeschooled, up 84% from 1999 when the U.S. Department of Education first started keeping statistics. This was 2.9% of all children.

As of spring 2016, there are 2.3 million homeschooled students in the United States. It is appearing that homeschooling is a continuing trend in the U.S. with a 2 percent to 8 percent per annum over the past few years Many select moral or religious reasons for homeschooling their children. The second main category is unschooling, those who prefer a non-standard approach to education. This is a parent-led type of schooling that takes place at home and is now boarding a mainstream form of education in the United States. The Demography for homeschoolers has a variety of people; these are atheists, Christians, and Mormons; conservatives, libertarians, and liberals; low-, middle-, and high-income families; black, Hispanic, and white; parents with PhDs, GEDs, and no high-school diplomas. One study shows that 32 percent of homeschool students are Black, Asian, Hispanic, and others (i.e., not White/non-Hispanic). There is no required taxes on this form of education and most homeschooled families spend an average of $600 per student for their education

Opposition to homeschooling comes from varied sources, including teachers' organizations and school districts. The National Education Association, the largest labor union in the United States, has been particularly vocal in the past. Opponents' stated concerns fall into several broad categories, including fears of poor academic quality, and lack of socialization with others. At this time, over half of states have oversight into monitoring or measuring the academic progress of home schooled students, with all but ten requiring some form of notification to the state.

== See also ==
- Tech ed
- Career and technical education
- Computational education - such as computer-based mathematics education
