= Les Tilleroyes =

Coordinates: 47°14′24″N 5°58′29″E

The area of Tilleroyes is a small section of Besançon, France, which is located to the north of the city.

== Toponymy ==
The term "Tilleroyes" is formed from the word for lime plus the oye suffix that means a collection of plants. There was thus likely a forest of lime trees in the area.

== Education ==
- Jean Boichard public kindergarten
- Jean Boichard elementary school
- School nurses

== Buildings ==
- Sports Center
- Castle Stables Galland
- Clinique Saint Vincent
- Sanatorium
- Castle Galland

== References and sources ==
- French page about Tilleroyes
