= Doubs's 1st constituency =

Constituency of the National Assembly of France

1st constituency of Doubs
- inline Constituency of the National Assembly of France

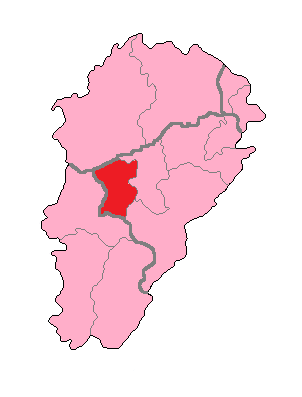
- The constituency within Franche-Comté
- Incumbent deputy: Laurent Croizier; MoDem
- Department: Doubs
- Cantons: Audeux, Besançon-Nord-Ouest, Besançon-Ouest, Besançon-Planoise, Boussières, Quingey
- Registered voters: 75,240 (2017)

The 1st constituency of Doubs (French: Première circonscription du Doubs) is one of five electoral districts in the department of the same name, each of which returns one deputy to the French National Assembly in elections using the two-round system, with a run-off if no candidate receives more than 50% of the vote in the first round.

== Description ==
The constituency is made up of the six former cantons of Audeux, Besançon-Nord-Ouest, Besançon-Ouest, Besançon-Planoise, Boussières, and Quingey.

At the time of the 1999 census (which was the basis for the most recent redrawing of constituency boundaries, carried out in 2010) the 1st constituency had a total population of 108,193.

Since 1988 the constituency has been a bellwether seat: that is to say, one where the voting has so closely matched the pattern exhibited in the overall result nationwide that opinion in the constituency can be viewed as an indicator for the political mood of France as a whole.

== Historic representation ==
Election	Member	Party
1986	Proportional representation – no election by constituency	
1988	Robert Schwint	PS
1993	Claude Girard	RPR
1997	Jean-Louis Fousseret	PS
2002	Claude Girard	UMP
2004	Françoise Branget	UMP
2007	Françoise Branget	UMP
2012	Barbara Romagnan	PS
2017	Fannette Charvier	LREM
2022	Laurent Croizier	MoDem
2024	Laurent Croizier	MoDem

== Election results ==
=== 2024 ===
Candidate	Party	Alliance	First round			Second round		
Candidate	Party	Alliance	Votes	%	+/–	Votes	%	+/–
Laurent Croizier	MoDEM	Ensemble	17,475	33.52	+6.77	19,324	36.18	-15.70
Séverine Véziès	LFI	NFP	16,555	31.76	+1.98	16,830	31.52	-16.60
Thomas Lutz	RN		16,264	31.20	+13.38	17,261	32.31	new
Marielle Pernin	ECO		923	1.77	-1.10			
Nicole Freiss	LO		780	1.50	+0.38			
Alain Ruch	EXG		133	0.26	new			
Elisa Moré	REG		2	0.00	new			
Votes			52,132	100.00		53,415	100.00	
Valid votes			52,132	97.19	-0.77	53,415	97.59	+6.19
Blank votes			1,096	2.04	+0.68	966	1.76	-4.30
Null votes			414	0.77	+0.09	354	0.65	-1.89
Turnout			53,642	70.77	+21.19	54,735	72.21	+23.88
Abstentions			22,151	29.23	-21.19	21,061	27.79	-23.88
Registered voters			75,793			75,796		
Result			MoDEM HOLD					

=== 2022 ===
Legislative Election 2022: Doubs's 1st constituency
Party	Candidate	Votes	%	±%
LFI (NUPÉS)	Séverine Vezies	11,022	29.78	+3.13
MoDem (Ensemble)	Laurent Croizier	9,901	26.75	-3.12
RN	Thomas Lutz	6,597	17.82	+7.32
LR (UDC)	Michel Vienet	4,075	11.01	−3.15
REC	Fabrice Galpin	1,608	4.34	N/A
PRG	Salima Inezarène	1,442	3.90	N/A
DVE	Marielle Pernin	1,062	2.87	N/A
Others	N/A	1,309	-	−
Turnout		37,016	49.58	+0.07
2nd round result
MoDem (Ensemble)	Laurent Croizier	17,465	51.88	-1.61
LFI (NUPÉS)	Séverine Vezies	16,198	48.12	+1.61
Turnout		33,663	48.33	+5.95
MoDem gain from LREM				

=== 2017 ===
Candidate	Label	First round		Second round	
Candidate	Label	Votes	%	Votes	%
Fannette Charvier	REM	10,902	29.87	15,143	53.49
Barbara Romagnan	PS	5,854	16.04	13,169	46.51
Françoise Branget	LR	5,170	14.16		
Anna Romano	FN	4,564	12.50		
Habiba Delacour	FI	4,238	11.61		
Laurent Croizier	DIV	1,964	5.38		
Pascal Routhier	DVD	1,940	5.31		
Claudine François-Wilser	Urgence Écologie ECO	546	1.50		
Alain Robert	ECO	399	1.09		
Kevin Meillet	DIV	363	0.99		
Nicole Friess	EXG	301	0.82		
Emmanuel Guerrin	DIV	262	0.72		
Votes		36,503	100.00	28,312	100.00
Valid votes		36,503	97.95	28,312	88.79
Blank votes		442	1.19	2,494	7.82
Null votes		323	0.87	1,082	3.39
Turnout		37,268	49.51	31,888	42.38
Abstentions		38,001	50.49	43,352	57.62
Registered voters		75,269		75,240	
Source: Ministry of the Interior

=== 2012 ===
2012 legislative election in Doubs's 1st constituency
Candidate	Party	First round		Second round	
Candidate	Party	Votes	%	Votes	%
Barbara Romagnan	PS	16,960	39.42%	22,923	54.73%
Françoise Branget	UMP	14,044	32.64%	18,963	45.27%
Robert Sennerich	FN	5,298	12.31%		
Emmanuel Girod	FG	3,145	7.31%		
Julie Baverel	MoDem	1,019	2.37%		
Mireille Pequignot		713	1.66%		
Camille Waechter	MEI	469	1.09%		
Catherine Billod	AEI	440	1.02%		
Nicole Friess	LO	319	0.74%		
Hervé Drouot	??	208	0.48%		
Patrick Thielley		190	0.44%		
Bernard Serafinowski	NPA	156	0.36%		
Daniel Duchêne		61	0.14%		
Valid votes		43,022	98.77%	41,886	97.27%
Spoilt and null votes		535	1.23%	1,175	2.73%
Votes cast / turnout		43,557	59.65%	43,061	58.96%
Abstentions		29,468	40.35%	29,973	41.04%
Registered voters		73,025	100.00%	73,034	100.00%

=== 2007 ===
Legislative Election 2007: Doubs's 1st constituency
Party	Candidate	Votes	%	±%
UMP	Françoise Branget	18,420	43.22	
PS	Barbara Romagnan	12,645	29.67	
MoDem	Philippe Gonon	2,927	6.87	
FN	Alain Dudret	1,842	4.32	
LV	Claude Mercier	1,783	4.18	
PCF	Christophe Lime	1,337	3.14	
EXG	Norbert Nusbaum	1,013	2.38	
Others	N/A	2,649	-	−
Turnout		43,289	60.60	
2nd round result
UMP	Françoise Branget	21,672	50.14	
PS	Barbara Romagnan	21,548	49.86	
Turnout		44,220	61.90	
UMP hold				

=== 2002 ===
Legislative Election 2002: Doubs's 1st constituency
Party	Candidate	Votes	%	±%
UMP	Claude Girard	16,881	39.17	
PS	Jean-Louis Fousseret	14,776	34.28	
FN	Robert Sennerich	4,978	11.55	
LV	Claude Mercier	1,914	4.44	
Others	N/A	4,553	-	−
Turnout		44,039	67.29	
2nd round result
UMP	Claude Girard	20,730	52.20	
PS	Jean-Louis Fousseret	18,980	47.80	
Turnout		41,615	63.59	
UMP gain from PS				

=== 1997 ===
Legislative Election 1997: Doubs's 1st constituency
Party	Candidate	Votes	%	±%
RPR	Claude Girard	12,485	30.96	
PS	Jean-Louis Fousseret	11,557	28.66	
FN	Robert Sennerich	6,533	16.20	
EXG	Martine Bultot	2,141	5.31	
LV	Michel Bouchy	2,051	5.09	
PCF	Annie Menetrier	1,819	4.51	
LO	Nicole Friess	1,153	2.86	
LDI	Francis Vuillemin	1,147	2.84	
Others	N/A			
Turnout		42,461	70.09	
2nd round result
PS	Jean-Louis Fousseret	23,067	53.26	
RPR	Claude Girard	20,242	46.74	
Turnout		46,057	76.03	
PS gain from RPR				

== Notes and references ==
Official results of French elections from 2002 taken from "Résultats électoraux officiels en France" (in French).
