= Amy Hughes (administrator) =

British nursing administrator (1856–1923)

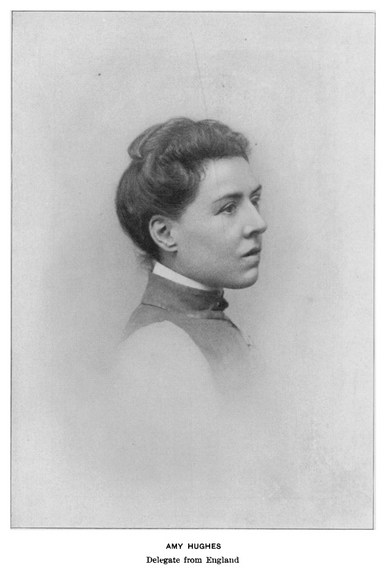
- Hughes, as a delegate to Congress of Nurses (1901)
- Born: 24 February 1856
- Died: 6 September 1923 (aged 67); Ewell, England, UK
- Known for: First British school nurse and lead for Queen's Nursing Institute

Amy Sarah Hughes (24 February 1856 – 6 September 1923) was a British nursing administrator. She is credited with being the first School Nurse. She led the Queen's Nursing Institute for twelve years and she was president of the Midwives Association.

== Life ==
Hughes was brought up in County Durham. Her father was the vicar at Holy Trinity Church, Darlington.

In 1892 she was working in Bloomsbury Square as the superintendent of Queen's Nurses. When she was asked to visit a local elementary school to advise about nutrition. Hughes was surprised to find that the students were suffering with minor ailments that were contributing to school days lost to sickness. Hughes arranged for Queen's nurses to visit schools. She is credited with being the first School Nurse in the UK.

In 1901 she was sent to the Congress of Nurses in Buffalo, New York.

In 1902 she started work at the Queen Victoria's Jubilee Institute for Nurses that had been founded fifteen years before. The organisation (now the Queen's Nursing Institute) was responsible for recognizing the top nurse in the United Kingdom. These nurses were placed on the "Queen's Role" and were known as Queen's Nurses. Hughes worked as a superintendent for the institute and her name was one of the first on the role.

She was appointed as the superintendent of the institute in 1905 after overseeing a difficult reorganisation project. In 1909 she wrote of "The Ideal District Nurse" for the Nursing Times. She was the superintendent of the institute until 1917.

Hughes died in a Ewell nursing home in 1923.
