= National Association of School Nurses =

American organization for School Nurses

The National Association of School Nurses (NASN) is an American organization that releases guidance on the role of school nursing and recommends minimum standards for the profession. It develops education programs for its members, publishes position statements and issue briefs on relevant subjects, and uses advocacy to increase support for school nursing.

== History ==
In 1968, the National Education Association created the Department of School Nurses to advance the profession of school nursing. Through the 1970s, each US state created its own association of school nurses under the umbrella of the Department of School Nurses. In 1979, the program formally split from the National Education Association, incorporating to become the National Association of School Nurses.

== Principles of school nursing ==
In its 2016 Framework for 21st Century School Nursing Practice, the NASN established five principles of school nursing:

1. Care coordination: student health should be integrated with education plans, direct care, and case management
2. Leadership: promoting advocacy for health care and education reform, policy development, and school nurse funding
3. Quality improvement: supporting the initiatives that have the greatest impacts on students' health and education outcomes
4. Community and public health: school nurses should work to improve education and health outcomes at the level of individuals and populations; school nurses should address social determinants of health such as students' home environments
5. Standards of practice: School nurses should adhere to clinical guidelines, ethics codes, and evidence-based practices

== Publications ==
NASN publishes a peer-reviewed journal, NASN School Nurse, which releases six issues annually. It also publishes a weekly newsletter for its members.
