= Fannette Charvier =

French politician (born 1984)

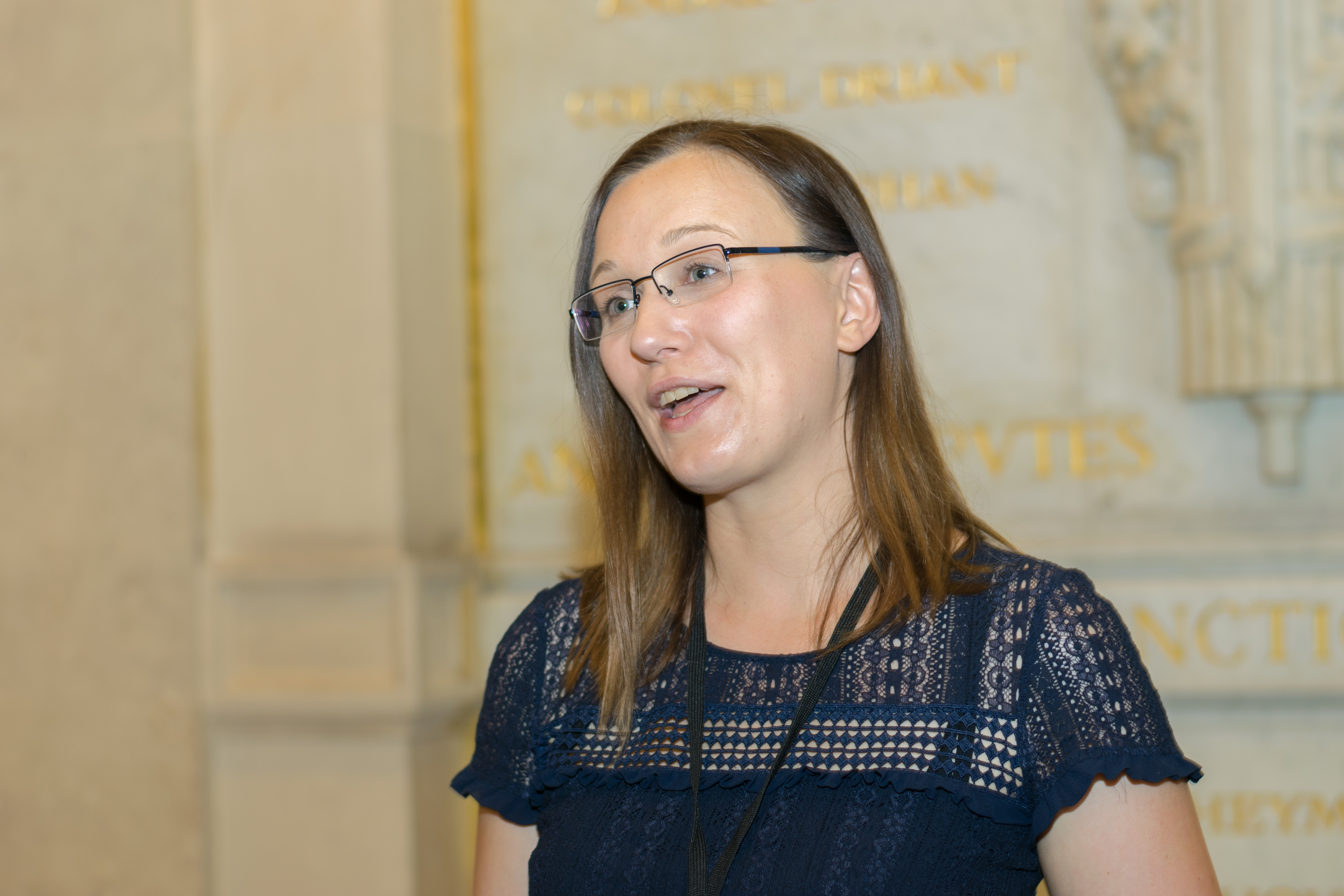

Member of the French National Assembly for Doubs's 1st constituency
- In office 21 June 2017 – 2022
- Preceded by: Barbara Romagnan

Personal details
- Born: 31 December 1984 (age 40); Annecy, Haute-Savoie, France
- Political party: Renaissance

Fannette Charvier (born 31 December 1984) is a French politician of Renaissance (RE) who served as member of the French National Assembly from 2017 to 2022, representing the department of Doubs.

== Political career ==
In parliament, Charvier served as member of the Committee on Cultural Affairs and Education. In this capacity, she was – alongside Anne-Christine Lang – her parliamentary group's rapporteur on l'école de la confiance, legislation introduced by Minister of Education Jean-Michel Blanquer in 2018 to restructure the French education system from nursery through to middle school.

In addition to her committee assignments, Charvier was part of the parliamentary friendship groups with the Netherlands and New Zealand.

Charvier did not seek re-election at the 2022 French legislative election.

== Political positions ==
In July 2019, Charvier decided not to align with her parliamentary group's majority and became one of 52 LREM members who abstained from a vote on the French ratification of the European Union’s Comprehensive Economic and Trade Agreement (CETA) with Canada.

== Other activities ==
- Conseil National du Sport (CNS), Member
- National Council of Higher Education and Research (CNESER)

== See also ==
- 2017 French legislative election
