= Françoise Branget =

French politician (born 1953)

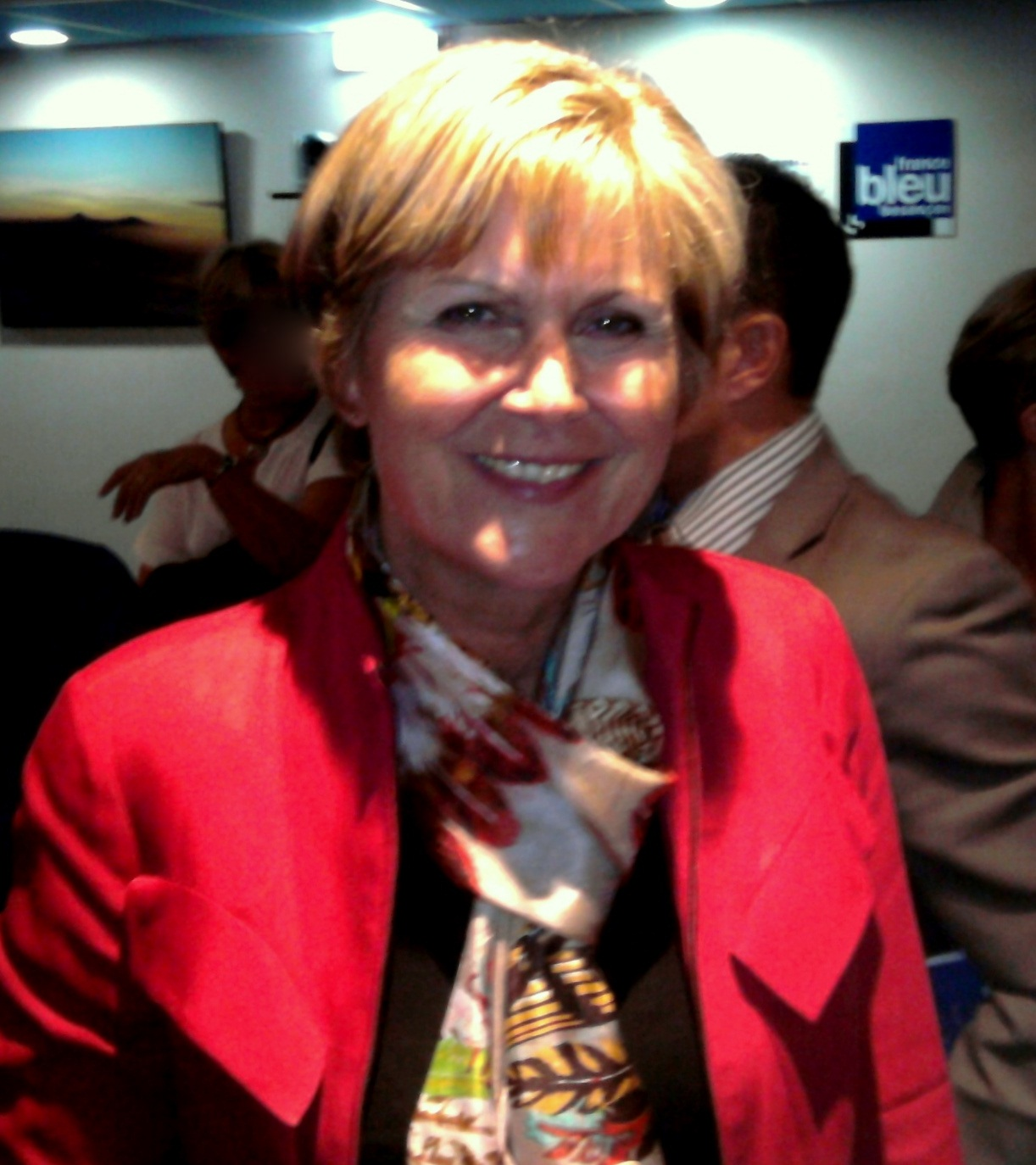

Françoise Branget (born 8 August 1953 in Chalon-sur-Saône, Saône-et-Loire) was the deputy representing Doubs's 1st constituency of the National Assembly of France. She was a member of the Union for a Popular Movement.
