= Jean-Louis Fousseret =

French politician

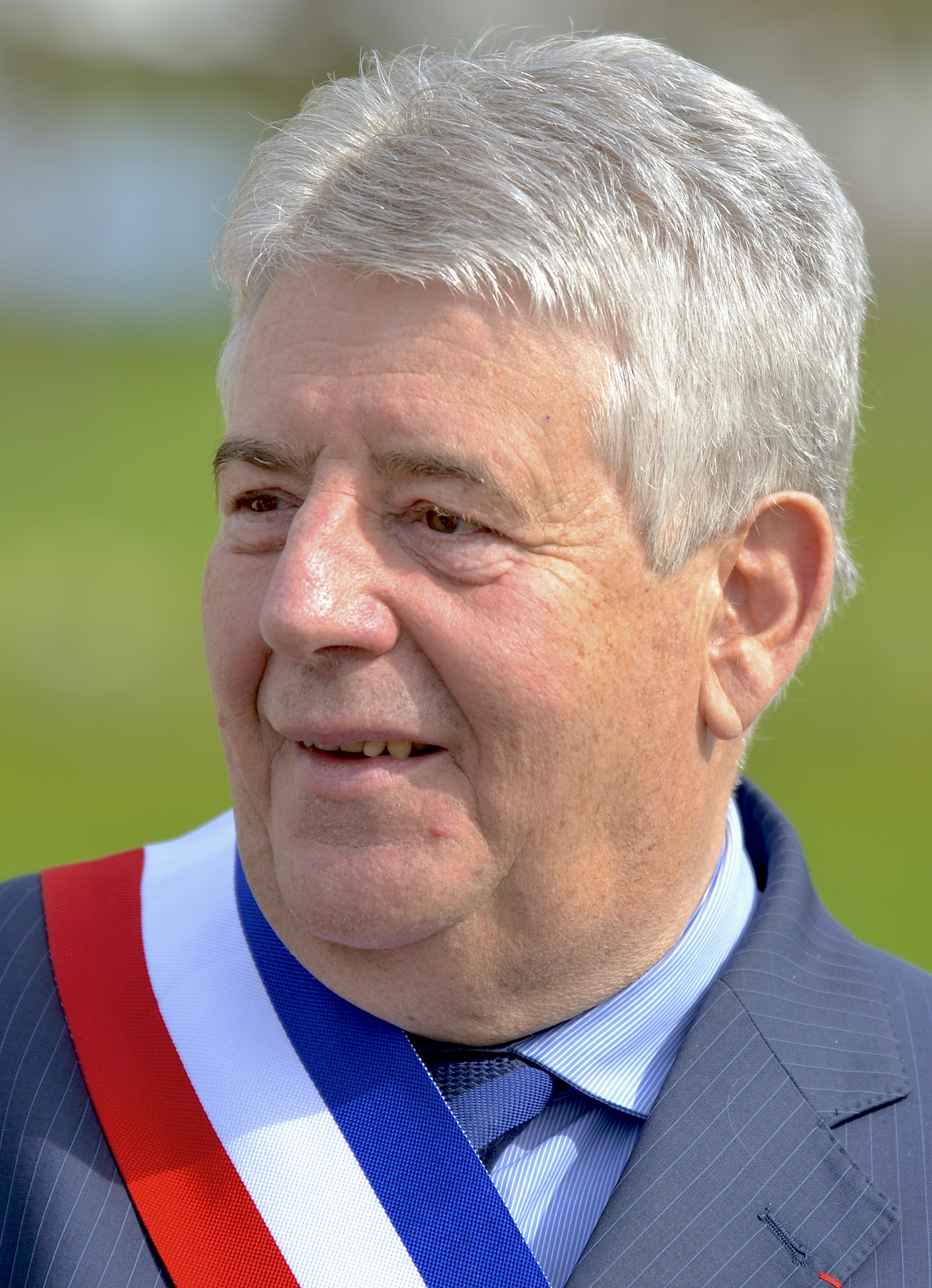
- Fousseret in 2014

Mayor of Besançon
- In office 25 March 2001 – 3 July 2020
- Preceded by: Robert Schwint
- Succeeded by: Anne Vignot

Member of the National Assembly for Doubs's 1st constituency
- In office 12 June 1997 – 18 June 2002
- Preceded by: Claude Girard
- Succeeded by: Claude Girard

Personal details
- Born: 23 December 1946 (age 79) Besançon, France
- Party: Socialist Party; Renaissance; Territories of Progress
- Relatives: Alain Fousseret (brother)

Jean-Louis Fousseret (born 23 December 1946) is a French politician. A member of La République En Marche!, Fousseret was Governor of the Canton of Besançon-Planoise from 1988 to 2001 and a Member of Parliament of the district of Doubs from 1997 to 2002. He was mayor of Besançon and president of Grand Besançon Métropole from 2001 to 2020.

== Biography ==
Fousseret was born in the French city of Besançon (Doubs, Franche-Comté). A technician in microtechnology, he graduated from the watchmaking school of Besançon and worked in the computer industry from 1967 to 1997.

His political career began when he entered the municipal politics of Besançon in 1983, and he was elected Governor of the Canton of Besançon-Planoise in 1988. On 1 June 1997, Fousseret became a Member of Parliament for the district of Doubs, and a member of the National Assembly of France. In 2001, he was elected mayor of Besançon and Governor of the agglomerated community of Besançon, and relinquished his technician post. Since being elected mayor, Fousseret has made improvements to the city, such as registering the Citadelle of Besançon as part of the Fortifications of Vauban.

Fousseret is also Vice-President of the Association of mayors of major cities of France and the LGV Rhin-Rhône association.

Close to the French President Emmanuel Macron, Jean-Louis Fousseret was appointed president of the training institute of La République En Marche! in July 2018.

== Mandates ==
General council of Besançon

- Since 1983: Municipal council
- 1983-1989: Adjunct of the mayor Robert Schwint posted to life of the areas of Besançon;
- 1989-1995: Adjunct of the mayor posted to tourism and at the association life;
- 1997-2001: Municipal council;
- 2001-2020: Mayor of Besançon

Grand Besançon Métropole

- 2001-2020: President

General council of Doubs

- 1988 - 2001: Governor of the Canton of Besançon-Planoise

Parliament

- 1997 - 2002: Member of Parliament of the first district of the Doubs
