= School nursing =

Practice of public health in schools

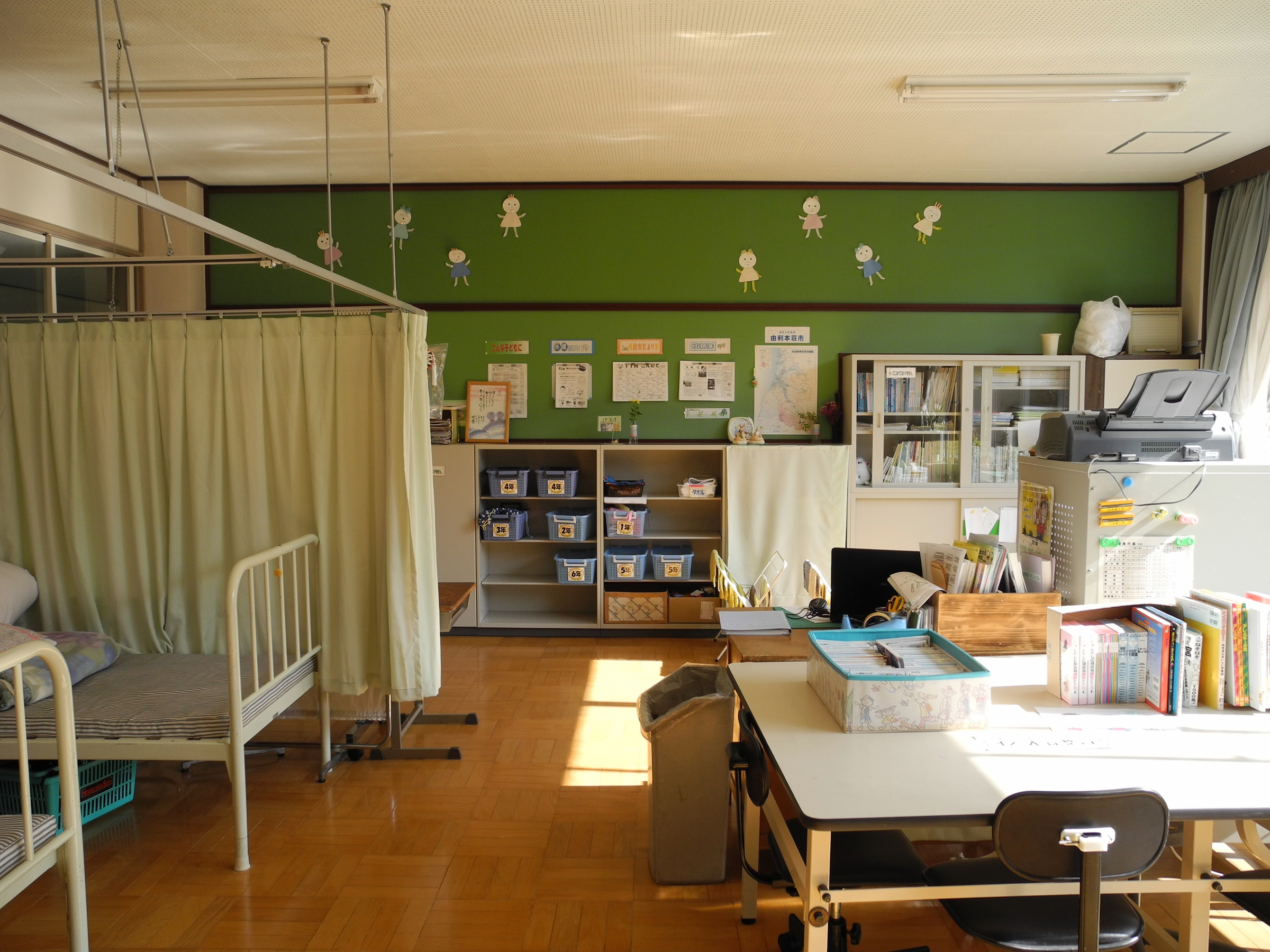
Japanese school nurse's room

School nursing is a uniquely specialized practice of nursing. It has foundations in public, population, and community health, as well as pediatrics and mental and behavioral health. School nursing protects and promotes student and school community health and safety, facilitates normal development, and advances academic success. School nurses, grounded in ethical and evidence-based practice, bridge the gap between health care and education, provide care coordination, advocate for quality student-centered care, and collaborate to design systems that allow individuals and communities to develop their full potentials. A school nurse works with school-aged children and their families within the context of the educational setting. Students experiencing illness or injury during the school day often report to the school nurse for assessment and care. Administering routine medications, helping a student manage a chronic condition, or stabilizing a child until emergency services arrive after a more serious injury may all be a part of the job requirements. School nurses also foster a healthy and safe school environment through population health interventions such as health screenings, emergency planning preparedness and response, and attention to environmental conditions within and around the school community. School nurses are essential members of interprofessional school teams, and they are well positioned to take the lead in health-related matters when collaborating with educators, school physicians, community primary care professionals, and community organizations. School nurses may facilitate the development of individualized educational plans and accommodations for students with healthcare needs, provide assistance in accessing programs such as Medicaid and the State Children's Health Insurance Program to help families and students enroll in state health insurance programs, and may support families in finding a medical home for each student who needs one.

== United States ==
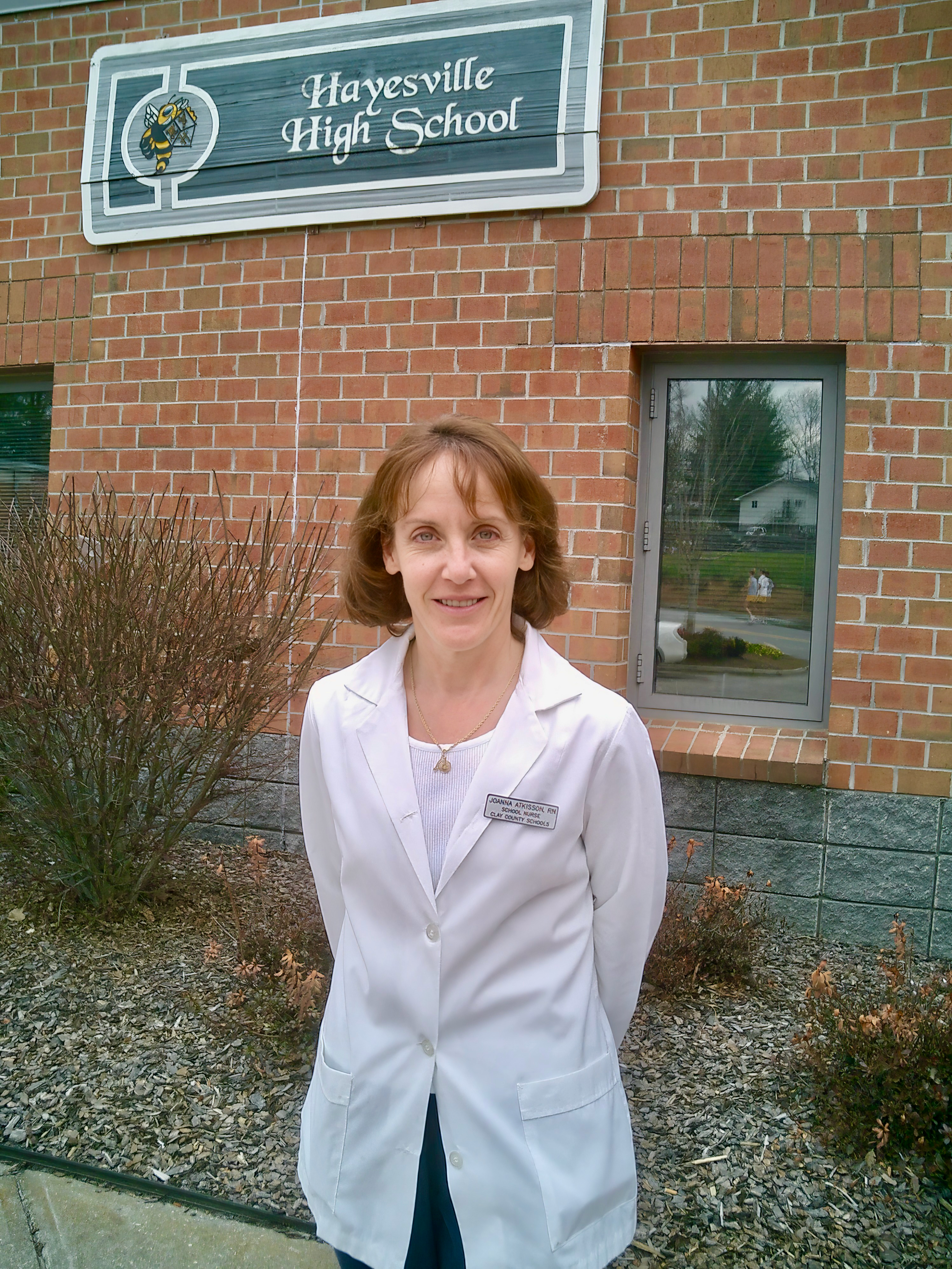
A school nurse for a public school district in North Carolina

According to the National Association of School Nurses, there are approximately 61,232–73,697 registered nurses (RNs) working in elementary and secondary schools (K-12) in the United States depending on the survey sample (Willgerodt et al., 2024), which represents between 2.1 and 2.8% of registered nurses in the United States. According to the American Federation of Teachers, there are approximately 45,000 school nurses employed in the United States. About 63% of public school districts employ a full-time school nurse, while a further 19% have a part-time nurse and 18% have no nurse. School nurses are often the only health professional serving students in an educational setting. As such they have a great responsibility in promoting important health initiatives in schools across America such as making sure that there are AEDs on school campuses and that staff are taught on how to use them. Sudden cardiac arrest is common among school aged children and adolescents resulting in <1 to 10 deaths/100,000 population per year. This is thought to be in part due to the fact that inherited and acquired cardiomyopathies, arrhythmia syndromes, structural congenital heart defects, myocarditis, and coronary abnormalities that may be present in this age group may not be detected during routine sports physicals. "Since strenuous exercise can trigger deadly arrhythmias in these students, the first and potentially last symptom [of undiagnosed cardiac abnormalities] is sudden cardiac arrest".

School nurses must use evidence-based practice, implement prevention programs, and properly manage student medical issues in order to improve student health. For students with acute and chronic health problems, the school nurse will collaborate with the student's primary care provider and parents to create a health plan that accommodates the student while at school. The school nurse must be competent in management of pediatric health issues such as seizures, asthma, diabetes, and allergies. In addition to nursing skills, the school nurse must possess excellent organizational and communication skills in order to succeed. School nurses play a vital role in the reduction of absenteeism by promoting healthy practices among students and staff.

School nurses have the potential to have a positive effect on their young students. Previous studies have addressed their role as helping families address health needs, decrease the amount of absent days from school, and helping them advance academically (Yoder, 2019). Across the United States, the school nurse's role and workload varies, so that has an effect on whether or they are able to properly address their student's needs (National Association or School Nurses, 2016; Yoder 2019). The presence of a school nurse varies among regions in the United States. According to Willgerodt et al., (2024) most school nurses on the west coast work part-time and have a higher caseload of students. In some schools in the U.S., there may not be a school nurse.

=== Notable school nurses ===
- Annie McKay, first school nurse in Massachusetts, 1905
- Lina Rogers Struthers, first school nurse in the United States, in New York City, 1902

== United Kingdom ==
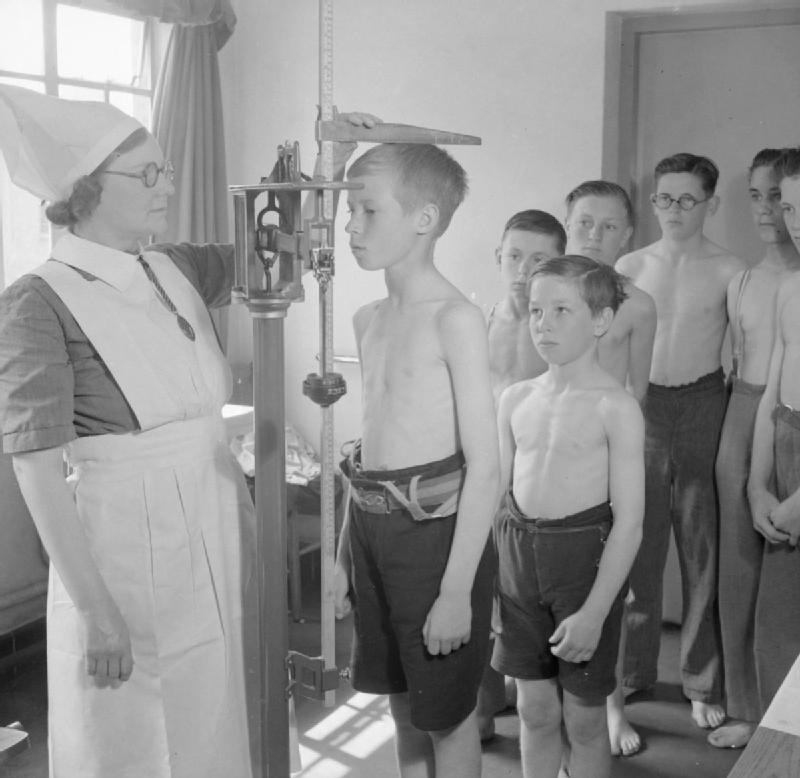
A school nurse measuring the heights of students in Hertfordshire

In 1892 Amy Hughes was working in Bloomsbury Square as the Superintendent of Queen's Nurses. She was asked to visit a local elementary school to advise about nutrition, and was surprised to find that the students were suffering with minor ailments that were contributing to school days lost to sickness. Hughes eventually arranged for Queen's nurses to visit schools; she is considered to be the first school nurse in the United Kingdom.

The statutory provision of school nursing in all schools in the United Kingdom arose out of the Boer War. A large proportion of army volunteers - between 40% and 60% - had been found to be medically unfit for service, so in 1903, the government set up the Interdepartmental Committee on Physical Deterioration to study the causes. In 1904 the committee reported back, saying that there was no general health problem, but treatable conditions had been left untreated, meaning that the conditions had worsened to the extent that they became debilitating. The committee recommended that:

- children have medical inspections in schools
- free school meals be provided to children from extremely poor families
- mothers be trained in child upbringing

The government reacted first by passing the 1906 Provision of School Meals Act, which allowed (but did not compel) local authorities to provide school meals, at no cost to the poor, and to raise a tax to pay for this. Then the 1907 Education Act was passed, which established a team of school nurses at every local authority. This was accompanied by the 1907 Medical Inspections Act, which required local authorities to ensure that each child received a total of at least three medical inspections during their time at school. The act established clinics within schools to treat anything discovered, but parents had to pay for treatment; after 1912 the government made small contributions towards the cost.

In modern times, school nurses are comparable to health visitors, but specialize in a school setting, rather than a domestic one. As such they normally take over public health responsibilities for children, from health visitors, once the children are over the age of five and start attending school. Like health visitors, they monitor child development, and deliver certain vaccination programmes, as well as instigating the child safeguarding process when they suspect a child is being abused or neglected. Given their physical setting, they are also often called upon to provide first aid, and it is for this that they are most familiar to children.

In the mid to late 20th century, school nurses were often familiar to children as the nit nurse - a specialist nurse who inspects children's head hair for lice, and lice-eggs (colloquially known as nits). In 1947, 8% of school children had lice infections, but the use of nit nurses had managed to reduce that to 3% within a decade. Skin infections of any kind, which were once common, had become a rare phenomena by the end of the century, except those which affect the soles of the feet. Under the Blair ministry, nit nursing came to be seen as not being clinically cost-effective, and nit nursing was gradually withdrawn from schools.

Following the Cameron ministry's reorganisation of the National Health Service, school nurses fall under the general aegis of Public Health England, but are locally commissioned by local authorities, who now hold local responsibility for public health. To become qualified registered school nurses, ordinary nurses undertake additional training as specialist community public health practitioners. They are regulated by the Nursing and Midwifery Council.

== Impact of school nursing on student achievement ==
Children who have chronic illnesses or live below the poverty line are more likely to end up dropping out of school. Two separate studies performed in 2017 looked at the way asthma medications were being managed in schools and found that nurses who assisted in daily corticosteroid usage resulted in fewer absences by children with asthma. Nurses in schools have the unique ability to create relationships with patients who they get to see frequently. Children spend nearly 40 hours a week in a school setting and need their health needs met just the same as if they are at home. If a child is able to receive their appropriate medications and services at school then they will be less likely to stay home and therefore achieve more academically than if their school lacks nursing services.

== The future of school nursing ==
School nursing in the future is challenged to accept leadership responsibilities in shaping, developing, and implementing policies that affect schools and communities. Becoming part of school boards, public health departments, and community organizations, school nursing can affect change and highlight the impact of social determinants on health because school nursing is where the effects of environments, school funding, and chronic health conditions on the health and education of children can be seen. According to the National Center for Education Statistics (2016), 98% of all school-aged children attend school each day. Therefore, health policies and health systems that affect children, families, and communities must be changed on local, state, and national levels.

== See also ==
- College health
